= 2024–25 Australian region cyclone season =

Cyclone season in Australia

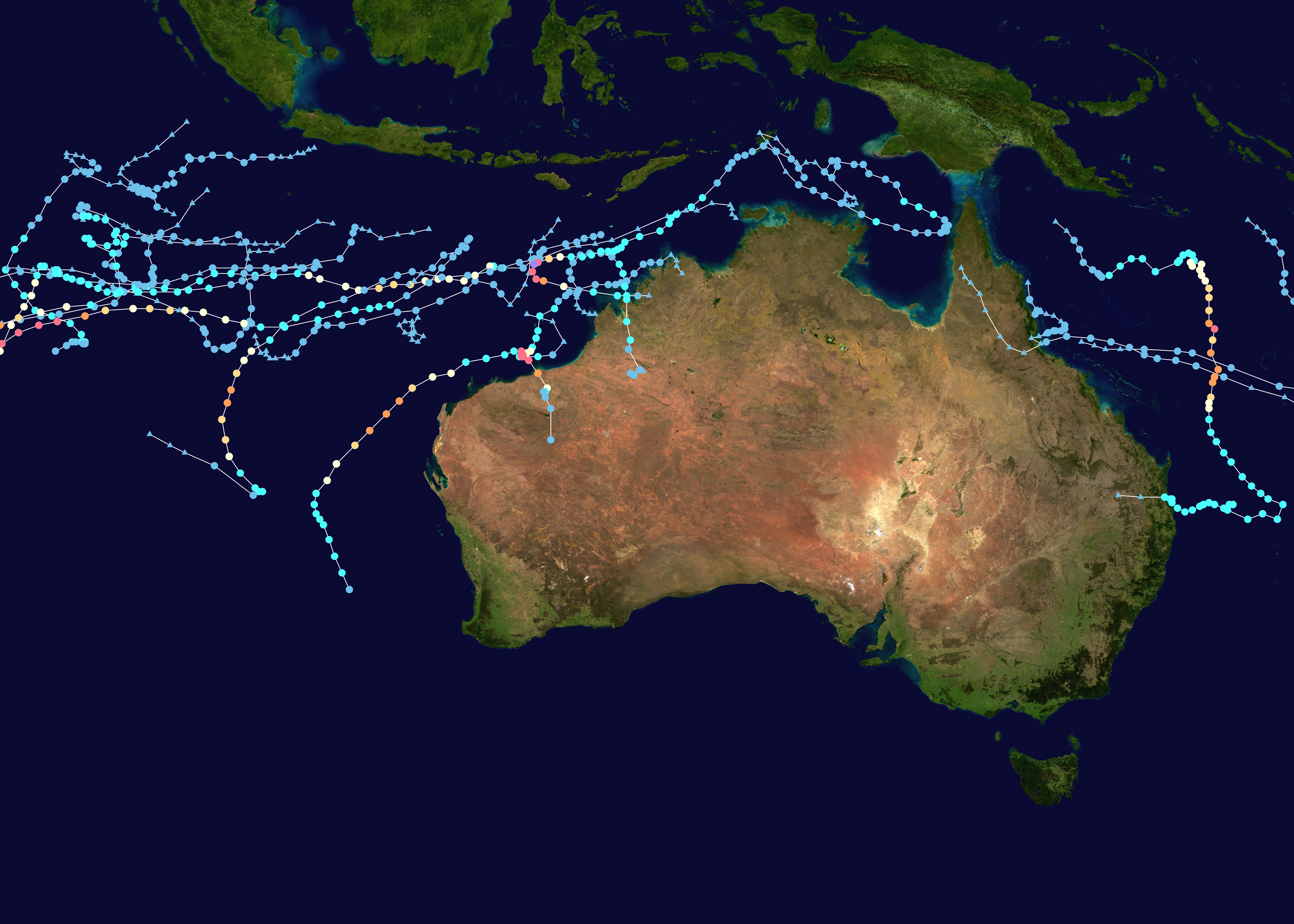
- Season summary map

Seasonal boundaries
- First system formed: 18 November 2024
- Last system dissipated: 14 May 2025

Strongest storm
- Name: Zelia
  - Maximum winds: 215 km/h (130 mph) (10-minute sustained)
  - Lowest pressure: 927 hPa (mbar)

Seasonal statistics
- Tropical lows: 26
- Tropical cyclones: 12
- Severe tropical cyclones: 8
- Total fatalities: 54 total
- Total damage: > $2.098 billion (2024 USD)

Related articles
- 2024–25 South-West Indian Ocean cyclone season; 2024–25 South Pacific cyclone season

The 2024–25 Australian region cyclone season was an above-average and damaging tropical cyclone season, producing 12 tropical cyclones and 8 severe tropical cyclones. Notably, it was the first above-average season in almost two decades, with the highest number of both tropical cyclones and severe tropical cyclones since the 2005–06 season. It was also the third consecutive season with at least five severe tropical cyclones. The season officially began on 1 November 2024 and ended on 30 April 2025. However, tropical cyclone formation is possible at any time, with any system forming between 1 July 2024 and 30 June 2025 counted as part of the season, as evidenced by Tropical Low 33U which developed in early May.

The first storm of the season, Robyn, was first noted by the Bureau of Meteorology (BOM) on 23 November 2024, eventually intensifying into a tropical cyclone 5 days later and peaking as a category 2. The precursor to Robyn caused heavy rainfall that killed 41 people in Indonesia. Multiple tropical lows developed during December, including 07U, which was classified as a tropical storm by the Joint Typhoon Warning Center (JTWC). The second tropical cyclone of the season, 09U, developed on 8 January. Operationally considered a tropical low, it was upgraded to a tropical cyclone in post-analysis. Later in January, Cyclone Sean formed and peaked as a category 4, becoming the first of eight severe tropical cyclones. 5 tropical cyclones formed in February, with all intensifying into severe tropical cyclones. Cyclone Zelia became the first category 5 of the season on 13 February before striking the coast of Western Australia the next day. Alfred meandered off the coast of Queensland for over 2 weeks before eventually making landfall in South East Queensland on 7 March.

March produced 3 tropical cyclones. 25U formed on 17 March, and was the second cyclone of the season to be operationally unnamed. Courtney was first noted on 22 March and intensified into the second category 5 cyclone of the season a week later before crossing into the South-West Indian Ocean. Dianne formed on 26 March, strengthening into a category 2 and making landfall in the Kimberley region of Western Australia. The final tropical cyclone of the season, Errol, developed on 9 April. It remained weak for almost a week before rapidly intensifying into a category 5 on 15-16 April. Errol soon weakened and made landfall in Western Australia before dissipating on 18 April. Two tropical lows, 30U and 33U, formed in the Arafura Sea in mid-April and early May, respectively. Both systems were classified as tropical storms by the JTWC. The season officially concluded on 12 May with the dissipation of 33U. Collectively, the cyclones during the season caused over $2 billion (2024 USD) in damage, mostly due to Zelia and Alfred, and 54 deaths, mostly due to Robyn.

== Season forecasts ==
Source/Record	Tropical Cyclone	Severe Tropical Cyclone	Ref
Record high:	21	12	
Record low:	3	0	
Average (1969–70 – 2023–24):	11	—N/a	

Ahead of the season officially starting on 1 November, the Australian Bureau of Meteorology (BoM) and New Zealand's National Institute of Water and Atmospheric Research (NIWA) both issued a tropical cyclone outlook that discussed the upcoming season. These outlooks took into account a variety of factors such as a developing weak to moderate La Niña event and what had happened in previous seasons such as 1983–84, 1995–96, 2005–06 and 2017–18. The Southwest Pacific tropical cyclone outlook issued by New Zealand's National Institute of Water and Atmospheric Research (NIWA) in conjunction with MetService, the BoM and various other Pacific meteorological services, predicted that six to ten tropical cyclones would occur over the South Pacific Ocean between 135°E and 120°W. The outlook also predicted that three to four of these tropical cyclones would intensify further and become either a Category three, four or five severe tropical cyclone on the Australian tropical cyclone intensity scale. In addition to contributing towards the Southwest Pacific tropical cyclone outlook, the BoM predicted that tropical cyclone activity within the whole region between 90°E – 160°E and each of its self-defined subregions would be near normal. They also warned that the likelihood of a severe tropical cyclone was higher than average because of the warmer than average ocean temperatures that had been forecast for the region.

== Season summary ==
=== Early season activity ===
The season officially started on 1 November 2024. On 14 November, the Bureau of Meteorology (BoM) noted the potential for a tropical low to form west of Sumatra. A westerly wind burst enhanced the disturbance's development. Despite moderate to high wind shear displacing deep convection, the tropical low gradually organised and the Joint Typhoon Warning Center (JTWC) issued a tropical cyclone formation alert on 23 November. On 28 November, the BoM stated that the system had intensified into Tropical Cyclone Robyn. The storm officially peaked as a category 2 cyclone before increasing wind shear caused the storm to dissipate. On 4 December, Tropical Low 04U formed off the coast of Java and headed west before dissipating on 11 December. The disturbance caused landslides and floods in Java, killing eleven people and leaving seven missing. Four other tropical lows — 02U, 06U, 07U, and 08U — also formed during December. Tropical Low 07U formed southeast of the Cocos Islands and JTWC designated it as a tropical storm. 08U later developed into Cyclone Dikeledi in the South-West Indian Ocean.

=== Peak season activity ===
The first half of January had Tropical Cyclone 09U and Tropical Low 10U. The latter half had Sean, 13U, Taliah, and Vince. On 17 January, the BoM designated Tropical Low 11U, which absorbed 10U, and later named Sean on 19 January. A day later, the storm rapidly intensified to a Category 4 major cyclone on the Australian cyclone scale, possessing a distinct eye and intense winds. Sean dissipated a couple days later. The cyclone caused heavy rainfall and gale-force winds across portions of Western Australia. A record amount of rain fell in Karratha, with 274.4 mm recorded within 24 hours on 20 January. Tropical Low 13U tracked along the coast of Queensland, causing severe flooding that killed a 63-year-old woman. On 31 January, the BoM designated Tropical Lows 14U and 15U, which were later named Taliah and Vince. Despite suffering from the effects of moderate wind shear, on 3 February, Taliah peaked as a Category 3 severe tropical cyclone on the Australian cyclone scale and Category 2 on the SSHWS scale. Taliah exited the basin on 12 February. Vince was named on 2 February and also intensified to a Category 3 on the Australian cyclone scale before exiting the BoM area of responsibility on 4 February. February started with Tropical Lows 16U and 19U, though both disturbances exited the basin and entered the Fiji Meteorological Service area of responsibility. Meanwhile, the BoM designated Tropical Low 18U on 7 February, which was named Zelia on 11 February. Zelia underwent rapid intensification due to warm sea surface temperatures and relatively low wind shear, becoming a category 5 severe tropical cyclone on 13 February. Afterward, the cyclone stalled and underwent an eyewall replacement cycle (ERC), which ended its rapid intensification phase. The storm soon made landfall near De Grey, northeast of Port Hedland. On 18 February, the Bureau of Meteorology designated Tropical Low 21U in the southeastern Indian Ocean. The system later strengthened into Tropical Cyclone Bianca. On 20 February, a tropical low in the Coral Sea was noted by the Bureau of Meteorology. The disturbance, designated tropical low 22U, was expected to develop into a tropical cyclone over the next several days. Two days later, BOM upgraded the system to a category 1 tropical cyclone, naming it Alfred. On 25 February, Bianca peaked as a Category 4 severe tropical cyclone on the Australian cyclone scale and Category 3 on the SSHWS scale. Afterward, increasing wind shear and cooler sea surface temperatures caused the storm to rapidly weaken, dissipating on 27 February. Over the next couple of days, Alfred continued to gradually move to the east, and was upgraded to a Category 2 tropical cyclone in the Australian scale at 16:00 AEST on 24 February. As Alfred turned south, it intensified to Category 3 status on 26 February at 22:00 AEST. The next day, the BOM further upgraded Alfred to a Category 4 cyclone, with a small eye appearing on visible satellite imagery. Later that night, an eyewall replacement cycle (ERC) occurred, prompting Alfred to fluctuate between Categories 3 and 4 on 1 March, before further weakening down to a Category 1 the following day. The cyclone then restrengthened slightly to Category 2 status by 3 March, before being downgraded to Category 1 intensity on 8 March. Alfred made landfall at Moreton Island on 01:00 AEST 8 March as a Category 1 tropical cyclone, and was downgraded to a tropical low five hours later.

=== Late season activity ===
Timelapse of Cyclone Errol explosively intensifying from Category 1 to Category 5 in less than 16 hours.

Tropical Low 23U formed on 4 March before exiting the basin on 8 March. The system later intensified into Tropical Storm Ivone in the South-West Indian Ocean. Another unnamed tropical cyclone, 25U, formed on 17 March before dissipating on 21 March. Tropical Low 27U formed on 22 March and strengthened into Tropical Cyclone Courtney three days later. Afterward, Courtney intensified to a Category 5 cyclone on the Australian cyclone scale before entering the South-West Indian Ocean on 29 March. Tropical Cyclone Dianne formed near North Australia on 28 March and made landfall near Derby on 29 March. On 8 April, Tropical Low 29U formed in the Arafura Sea. Three days later, JTWC designated Tropical Cyclone 29S. Later on 15 April, 29S was designated as Errol by BoM. Shortly after the designation, the cyclone explosively intensified to a powerful Category 5 severe tropical cyclone. Tropical Low 30U formed in the Arafura Sea on 16 April. On 18 April, JTWC designated 30U as 31P. It was expected to strengthen, but wind shear soon caused it to dissipate on 23 April.

=== Off-season ===
On 9 May 2025, Tropical Low 33U formed near Papua New Guinea. During 11 May, this system was upgraded to a tropical storm by the JTWC and designated 32P. 33U dissipated the next day. On 14 May, Tropical Low 34U formed near the Solomon Islands. It meandered around the southern Solomon Sea but dissipated the next day, ending the season.

== Systems ==
=== Tropical Cyclone Robyn ===
- Category 2 tropical cyclone (Australian scale)
- Tropical storm (SSHWS)
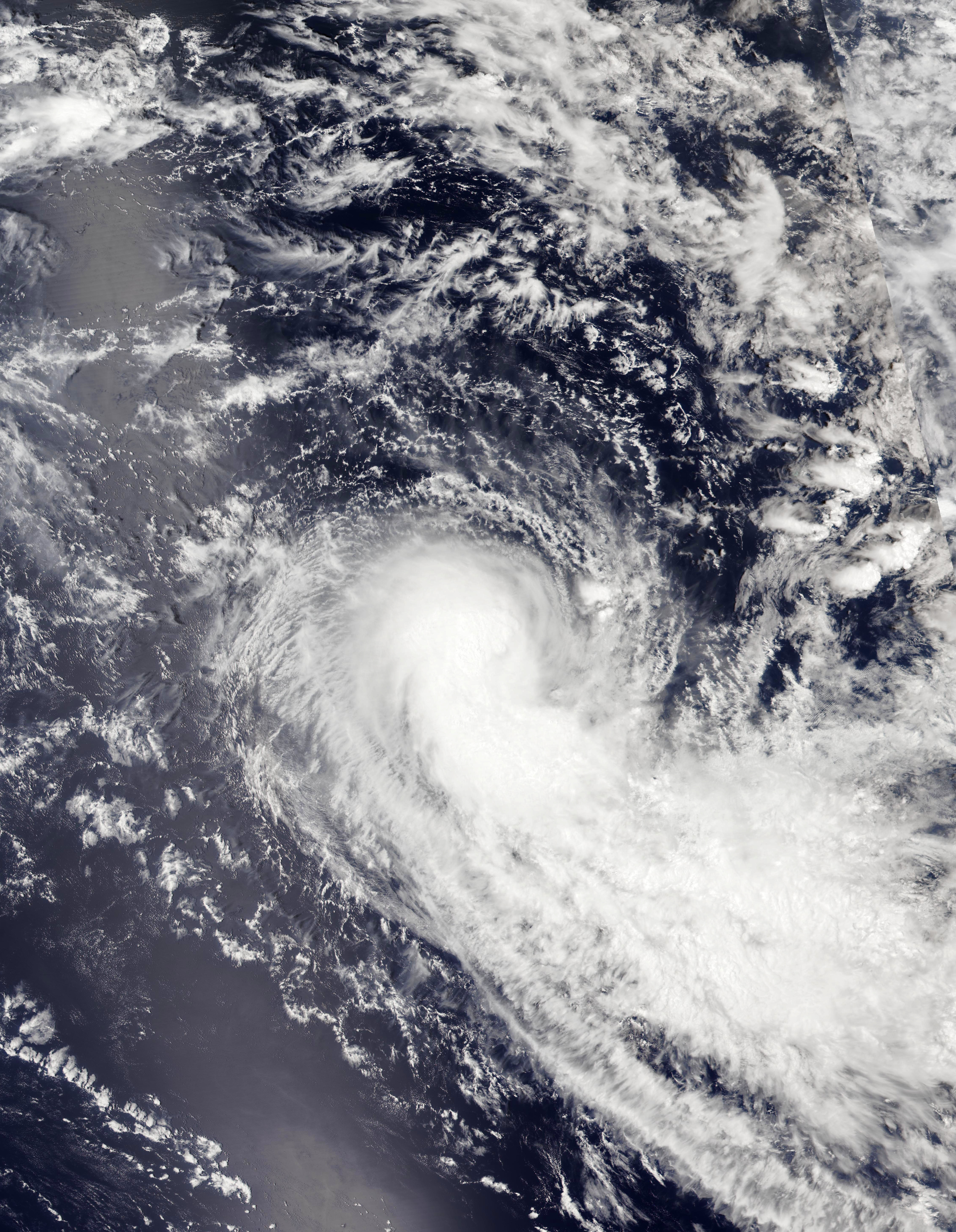
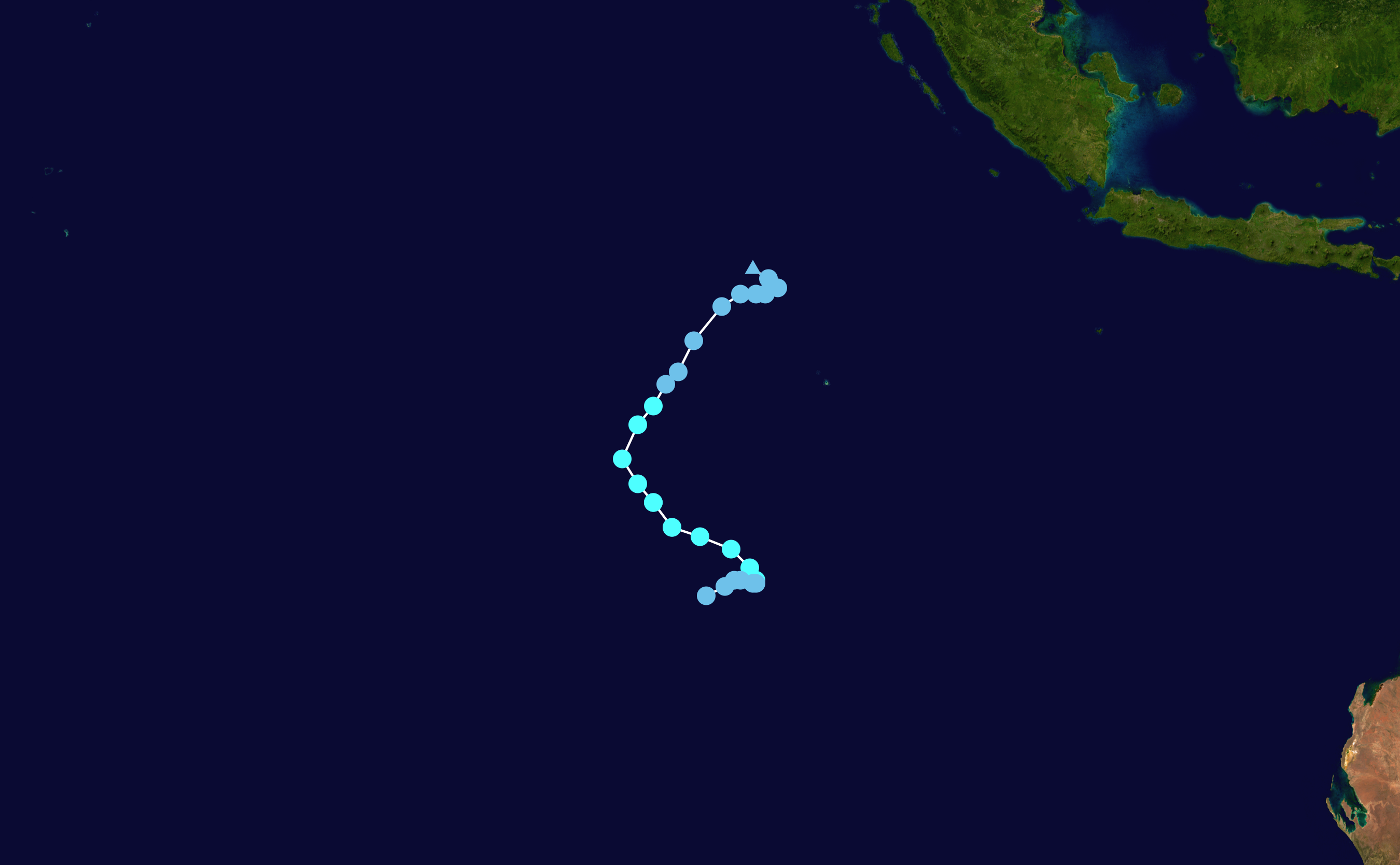
- Duration: 18 November – 30 November
- Peak intensity: 100 km/h (65 mph) (10-min); 985 hPa (mbar)

On 14 November, the Bureau of Meteorology (BoM) noted that a tropical low could form west of Sumatra, Indonesia. Several days later, they noted that the tropical low was developing. Further consolidation due to a westerly wind burst, which also spawned a twin cyclone, prompted the Joint Typhoon Warning Center (JTWC) to first track it on 23 November. Despite deep convection being displaced due to moderate to high wind shear, the system's circulation became increasingly defined, prompting the JTWC to issue a tropical cyclone formation alert (TCFA) on the disturbance. The JTWC then upgraded the system into a tropical storm, designating it as 03S. By 28 November, the BoM reported that it intensified into a tropical cyclone, being named Robyn, before reaching peak intensity late in the same day, with winds of 55 knots (102 km/h; 63 mph). However, strong wind shear and dry air made the system to rapidly weaken, becoming a gale-force tropical low by 29 November.

=== Tropical Low 07U ===
- Tropical low (Australian scale)
- Tropical storm (SSHWS)
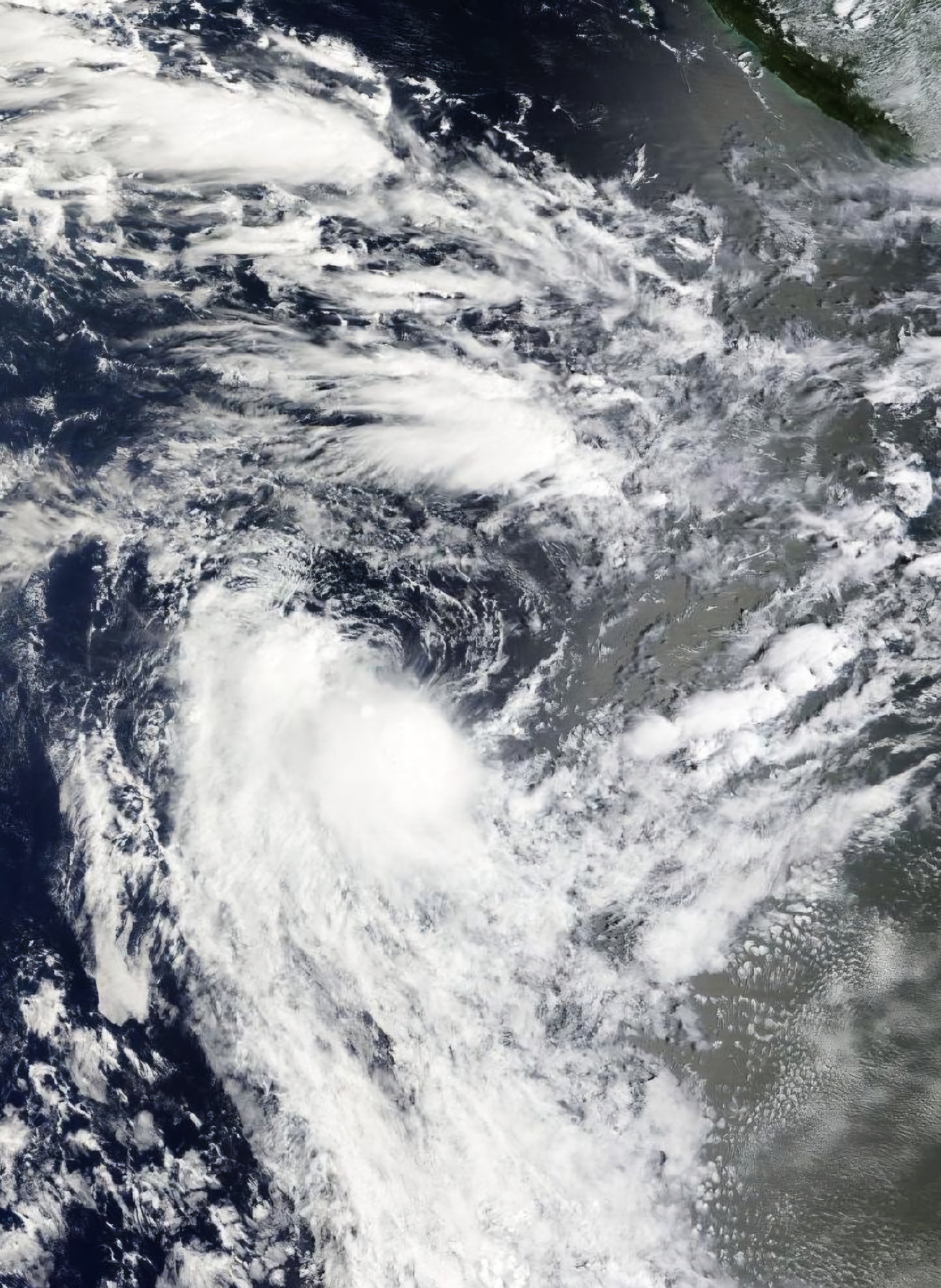
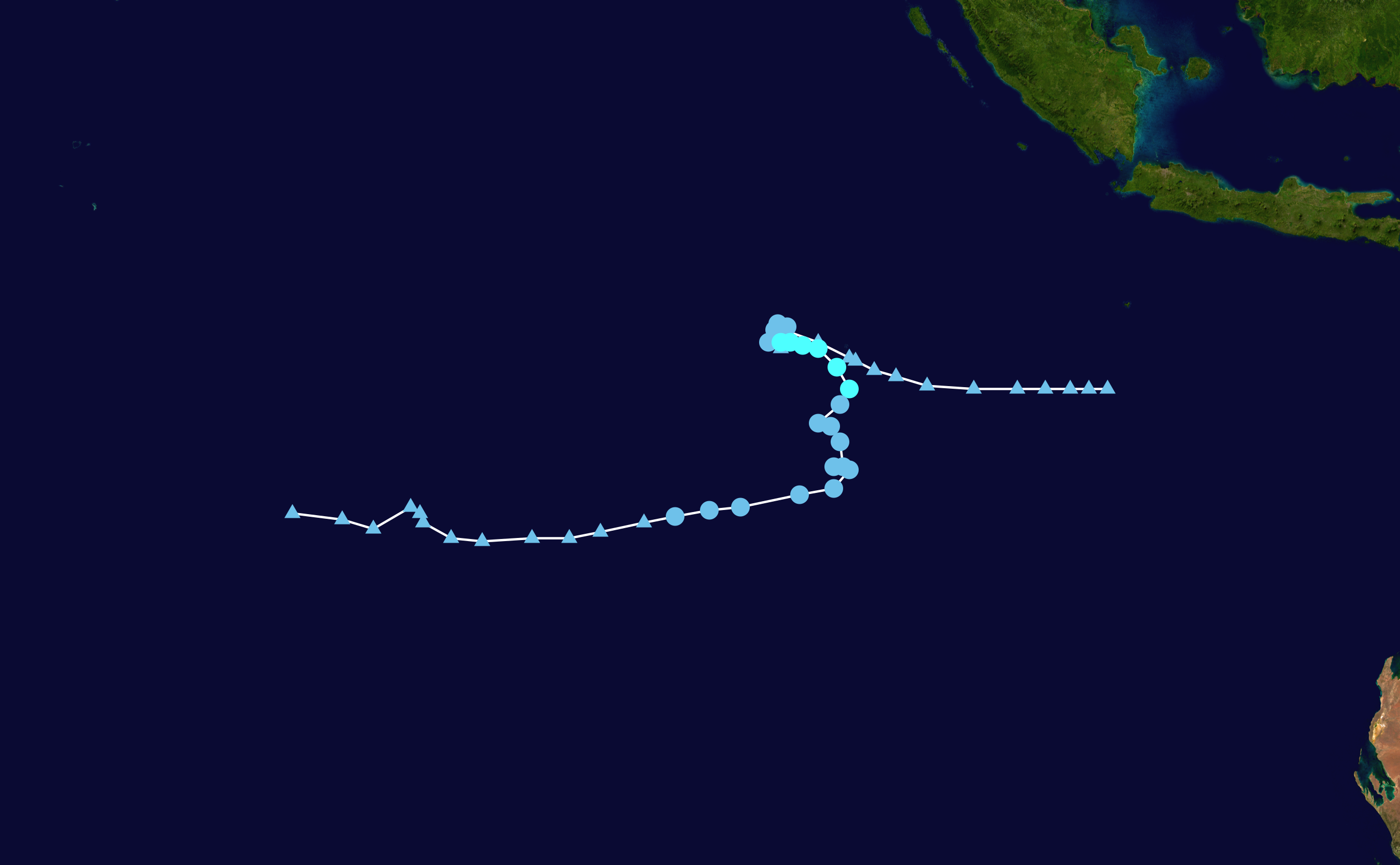
- Duration: 24 December – 31 December
- Peak intensity: 65 km/h (40 mph) (10-min); 999 hPa (mbar)

Late on 23 December, the JTWC began to monitor an area of convection approximately 99 nautical miles (183 km) southeast of the Cocos (Keeling) Islands. At the time, it had a weakly defined centre, and was within an environment of warm sea surface temperatures, low vertical wind shear, and good dual-channel divergence aloft. The BoM subsequently started to monitor it, designating it as 07U. Over the next few days, the tropical low began to organize as it moved westwards, with persistent convection over its consolidating centre as shear began to increase. As a result, the JTWC issued a TCFA on 07U by 26 December. Late on the same day, the BoM began to issue advisories on 07U, as gale-force winds developed to the west of the system, but did not meet their naming criteria. Nonetheless, the JTWC upgraded the system to a tropical storm early on 27 December, designating it as 05S. Moving east-southeast, the system began to weaken, as increasing wind shear led to its centre becoming exposed, separating from its deep convection. By the next day, deep convection was redeveloping in its ill-defined centre, before becoming fully exposed once again, prompting the JTWC to issue its final advisory six hours later. The BoM, however, continued to track 07U as it moved southward, before issuing their final advisory early on 29 December. The tropical low was last noted at 31 December, when it moved outside the Australian area of responsibility.

=== Tropical Cyclone 09U ===
- Category 1 tropical cyclone (Australian scale)
- Tropical storm (SSHWS)
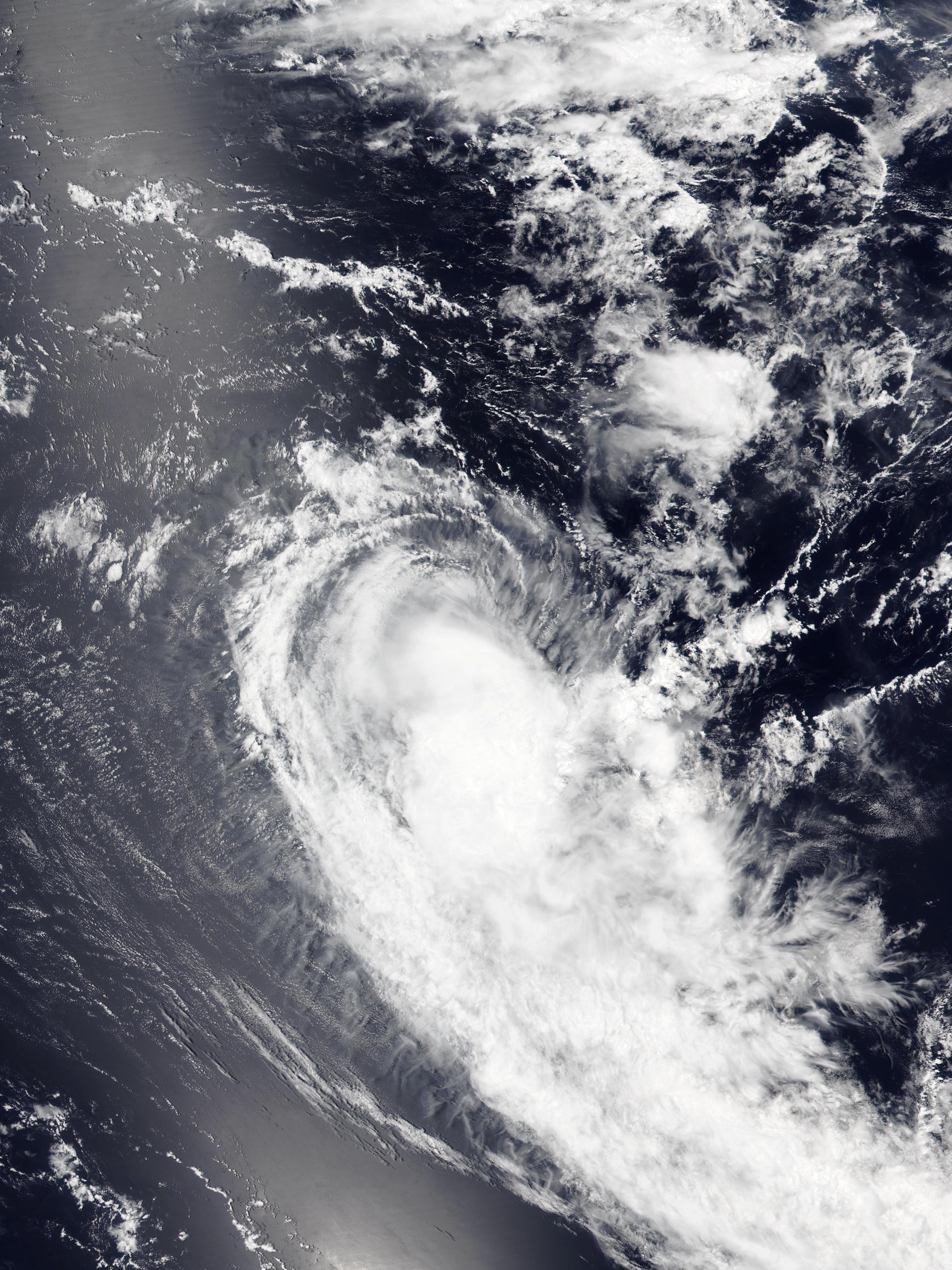
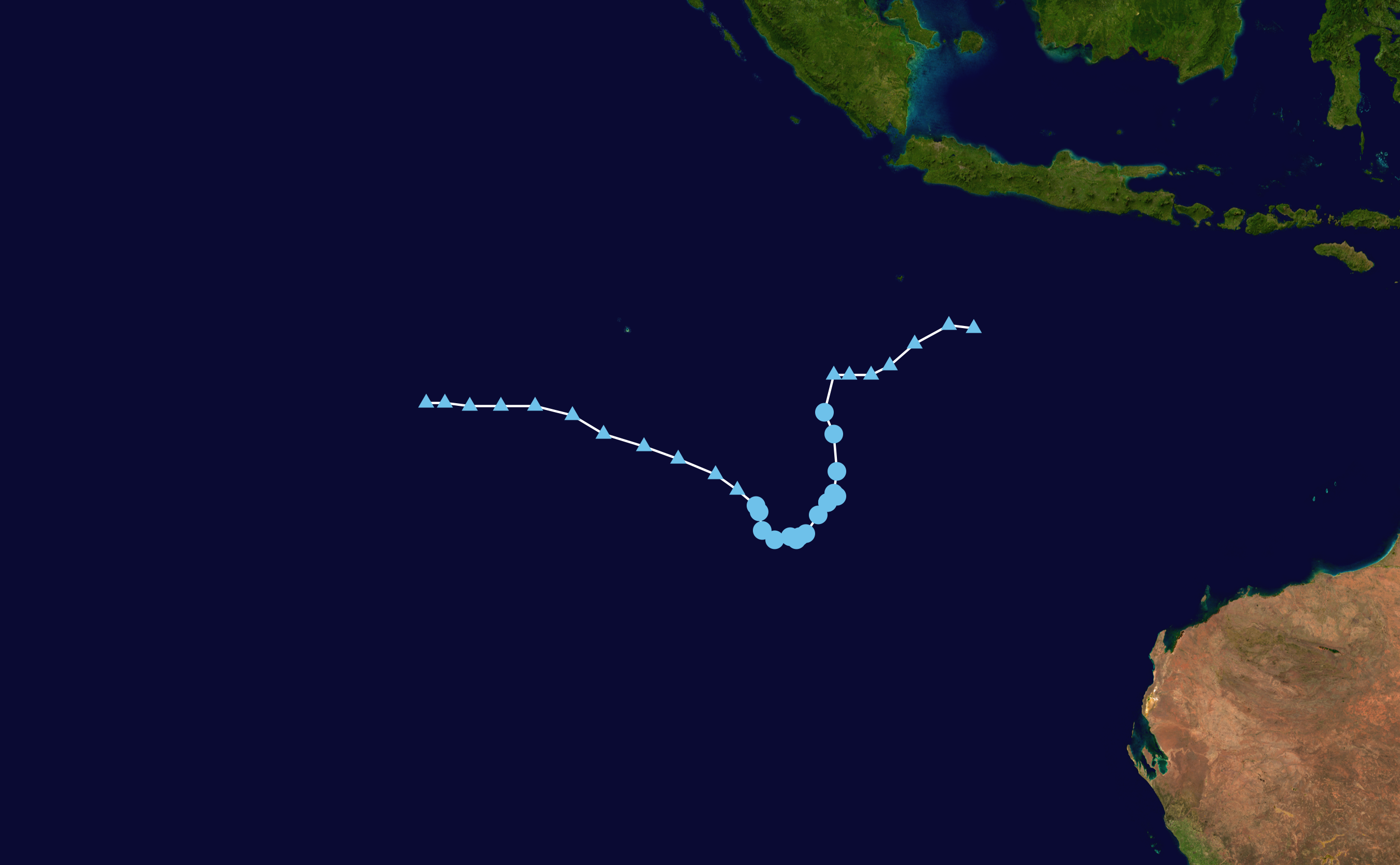
- Duration: 8 January – 13 January
- Peak intensity: 75 km/h (45 mph) (10-min); 1000 hPa (mbar)

On 8 January, the BoM reported that Tropical Low 09U had formed to the south of Christmas Island, within an environment of warm sea surface temperatures and moderate easterly shear. As it moved southwestward, it began to organize as wind shear decreased, with persistent convection to the south of its centre. By 10 January, an ASCAT pass showed the low had developed gale-force winds extending halfway to its centre, prompting the BoM to upgrade 09U to a category 1 tropical cyclone; operationally, it was not named, with gale-force winds estimated only at its southwest quadrant. At the same time, the JTWC issued a TCFA on the system, noting deep convection building over its centre. However, increasing northwesterly shear and a dry air intrusion caused the system to rapidly weaken below tropical cyclone status, leading to the BoM issuing its final advisory and the JTWC cancelling its TCFA late on the same day. The remnants of the system continued westwards, being last noted on 13 January.

=== Severe Tropical Cyclone Sean ===
- Category 4 severe tropical cyclone (Australian scale)
- Category 4 tropical cyclone (SSHWS)
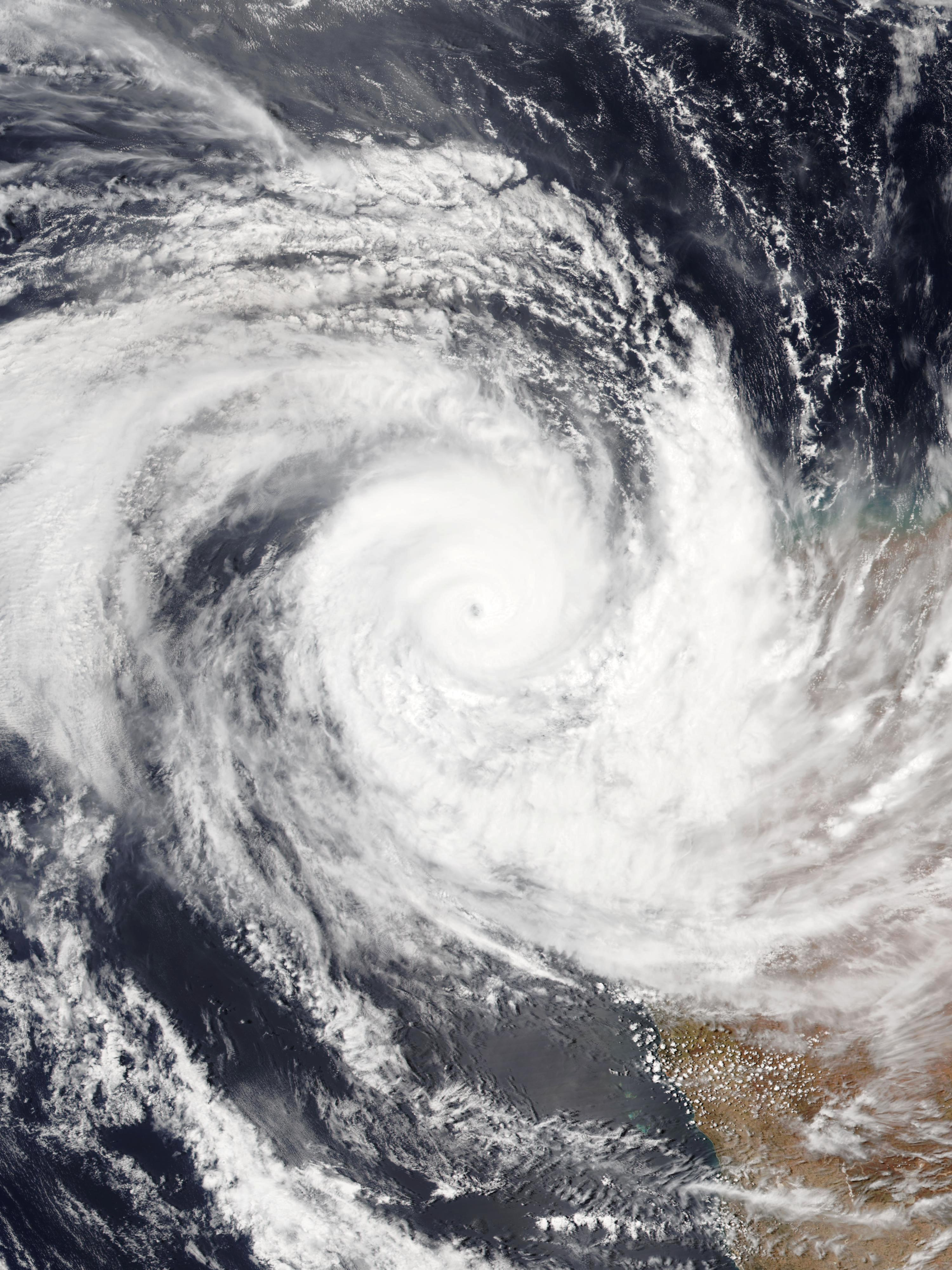
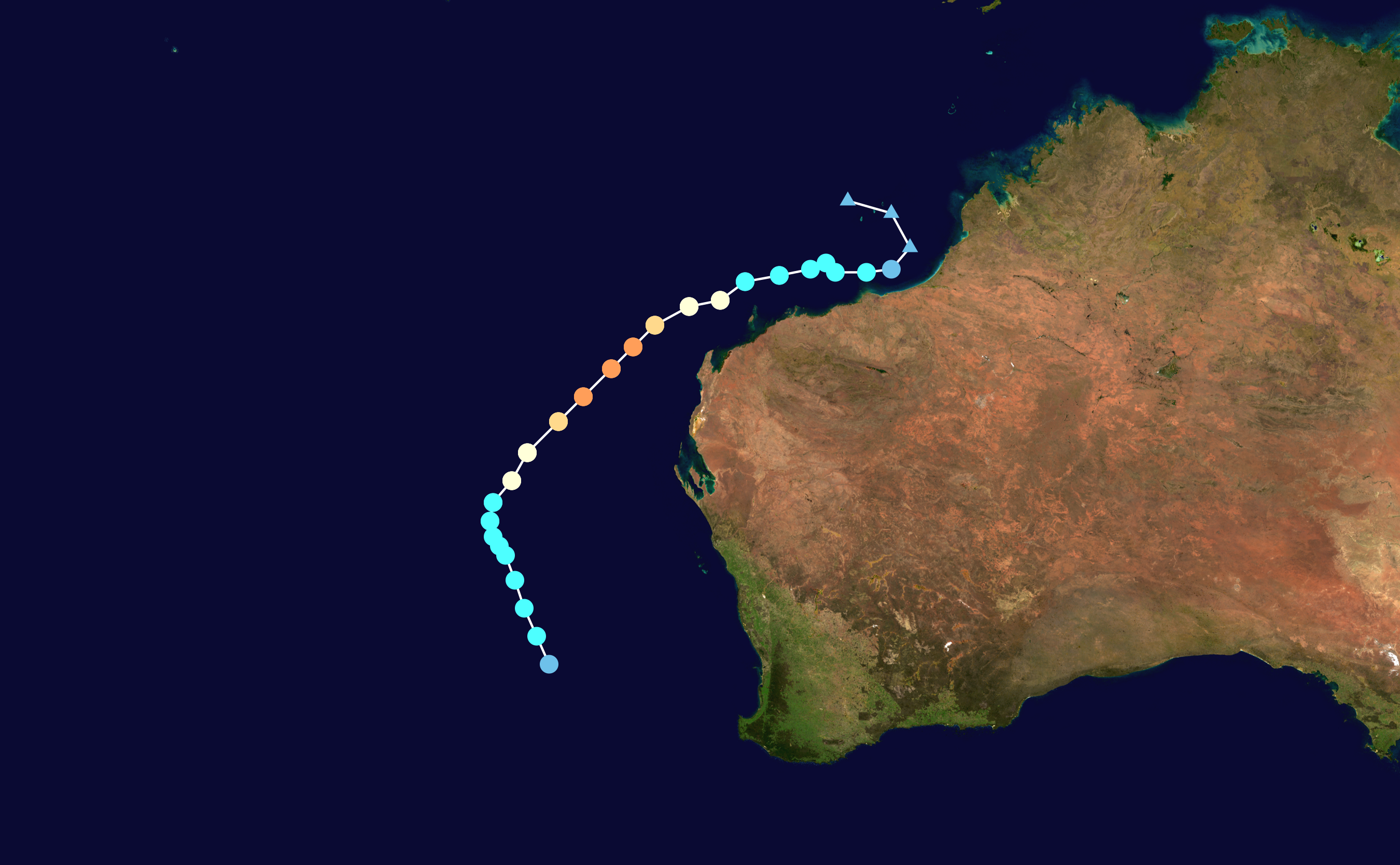
- Duration: 17 January – 22 January
- Peak intensity: 175 km/h (110 mph) (10-min); 945 hPa (mbar)

On 16 January, the JTWC began to monitor an area of convection that had formed to the west of the Kimberley coast, aided by an equatorial Rossby wave passing to the north of Australia. At the time, it had a partially exposed centre, with deep convection wrapping to the south of the system. As it moved generally southwestward, its centre began to consolidate within an environment of record warm sea surface temperatures, low vertical wind shear, and moderate poleward outflow aloft, prompting the JTWC to issue a TCFA late on the next day, before designating the system as Tropical Cyclone 10S by 18 January, noting its rapid development as it merged with Tropical Low 10U. The BoM followed suit soon after, designating the low as 11U. Continuing to organize, gale-force winds soon extended halfway to its centre, prompting the BoM to upgrade 11U to a category 1 tropical cyclone early on the next day, naming it Sean.

Sean then began to rapidly intensify, as it developed a 15 nmi (28 km) pinhole eye, becoming a category 3 severe tropical cyclone in the Australian scale and a category 1-equivalent tropical cyclone on the Saffir-Simpson scale respectively by 12:00 UTC that same day. By 20 January, the BoM upgraded Sean to a category 4 severe tropical cyclone, with the JTWC following suit and upgrading Sean into a category 3-equivalent tropical cyclone. Sean then reached peak intensity at 12:00 UTC that same day.

Moving into cooler sea surface temperatures, Sean immediately began to weaken, with the BoM downgrading the system to a category 3 severe tropical cyclone. The JTWC followed suit and downgraded Sean to a category 2-equivalent tropical cyclone by 21 January, as a dry air entrainment eroded the system's convection. Six hours later, it further weakened into a category 1-equivalent tropical cyclone. By 12:00 UTC that same day, the BoM had downgraded Sean to a category 2 tropical cyclone, as it continued to weaken. The JTWC soon followed suit, downgrading Sean to a tropical storm. The system then further weakened into a category 1 tropical cyclone by 22 January, before the BoM stopped advisories six hours later, as Sean became a cold-core low. The JTWC continued to track Sean, as it further weakened within an environment of high vertical wind shear, low sea surface temperatures and dry air. By the next day, the JTWC stopped monitoring Sean, as its centre became further elongated.

Cyclone Sean caused a record amount of rain to fall in Karratha, with 274.4 mm recorded in the 24 hours until 9:00 AM local time on 20 January. Roads and homes were inundated, power grids were damaged, and ports were closed. Damage totaled to AU$6.5 million (US$4.65 million).

=== Tropical Low 13U ===
- Tropical low (Australian scale)
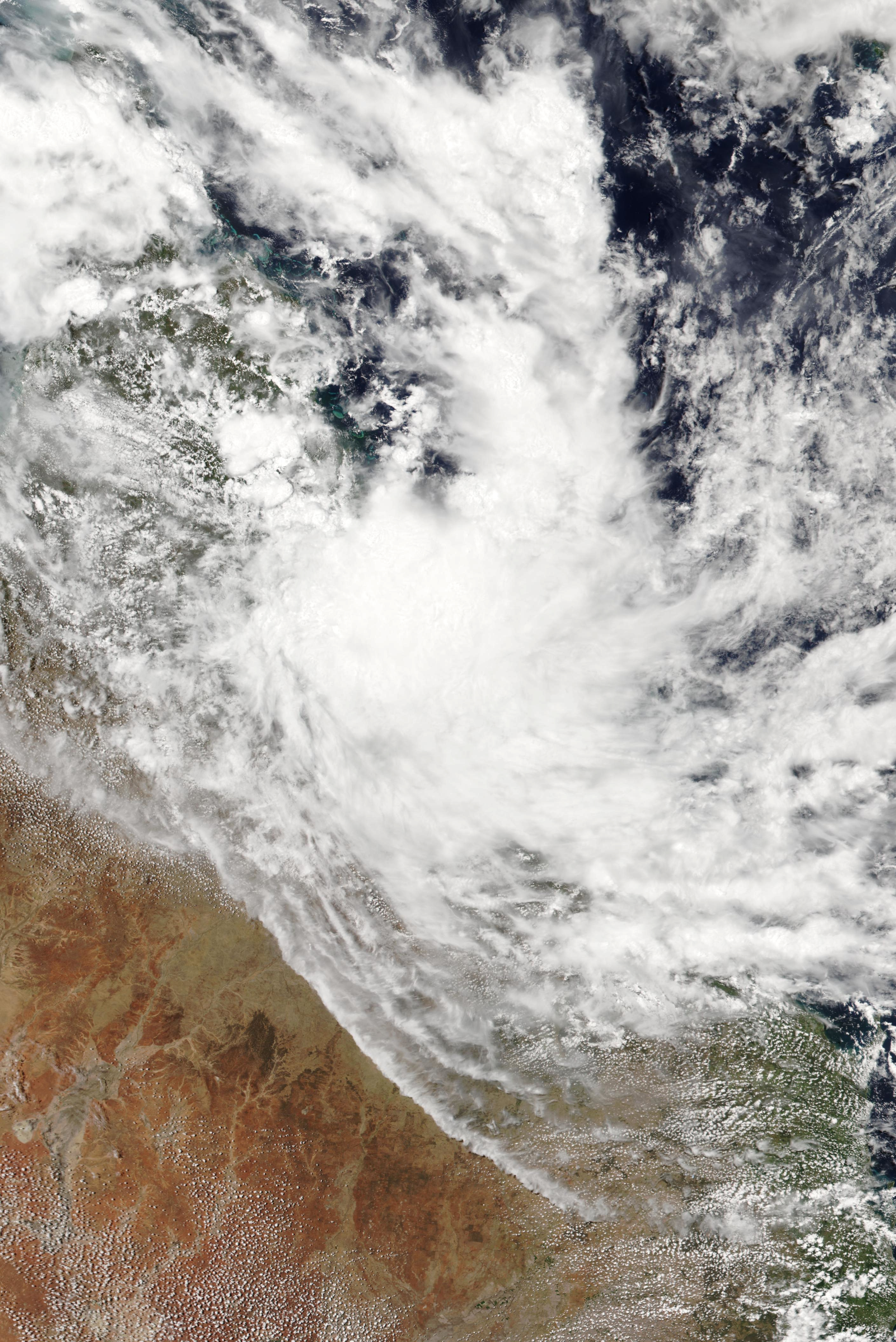
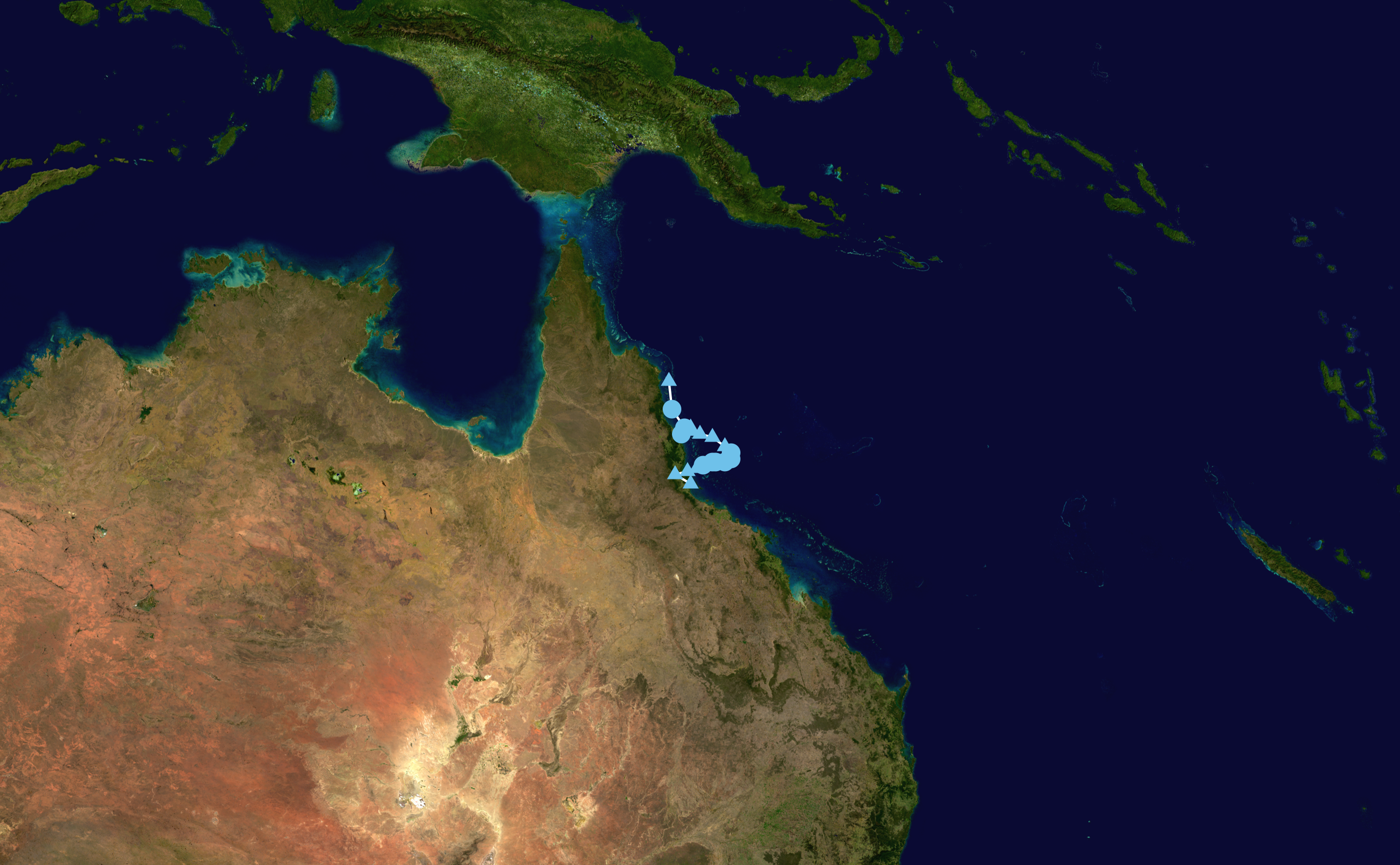
- Duration: 29 January – 2 February
- Peak intensity: 55 km/h (35 mph) (10-min); 999 hPa (mbar)

Tropical Low 13U formed on 28 January, tracked along the coast of Queensland, before dissipating on 1 February. It caused major flooding in Northern Queensland which killed a 63-year-old woman. Cardwell Range recorded weekly rainfall totals of 1,697 millimetres (66.8 in), with 626 millimetres (24.6 in) in a day.

=== Severe Tropical Cyclone Taliah ===
- Category 3 severe tropical cyclone (Australian scale)
- Category 1 tropical cyclone (SSHWS)
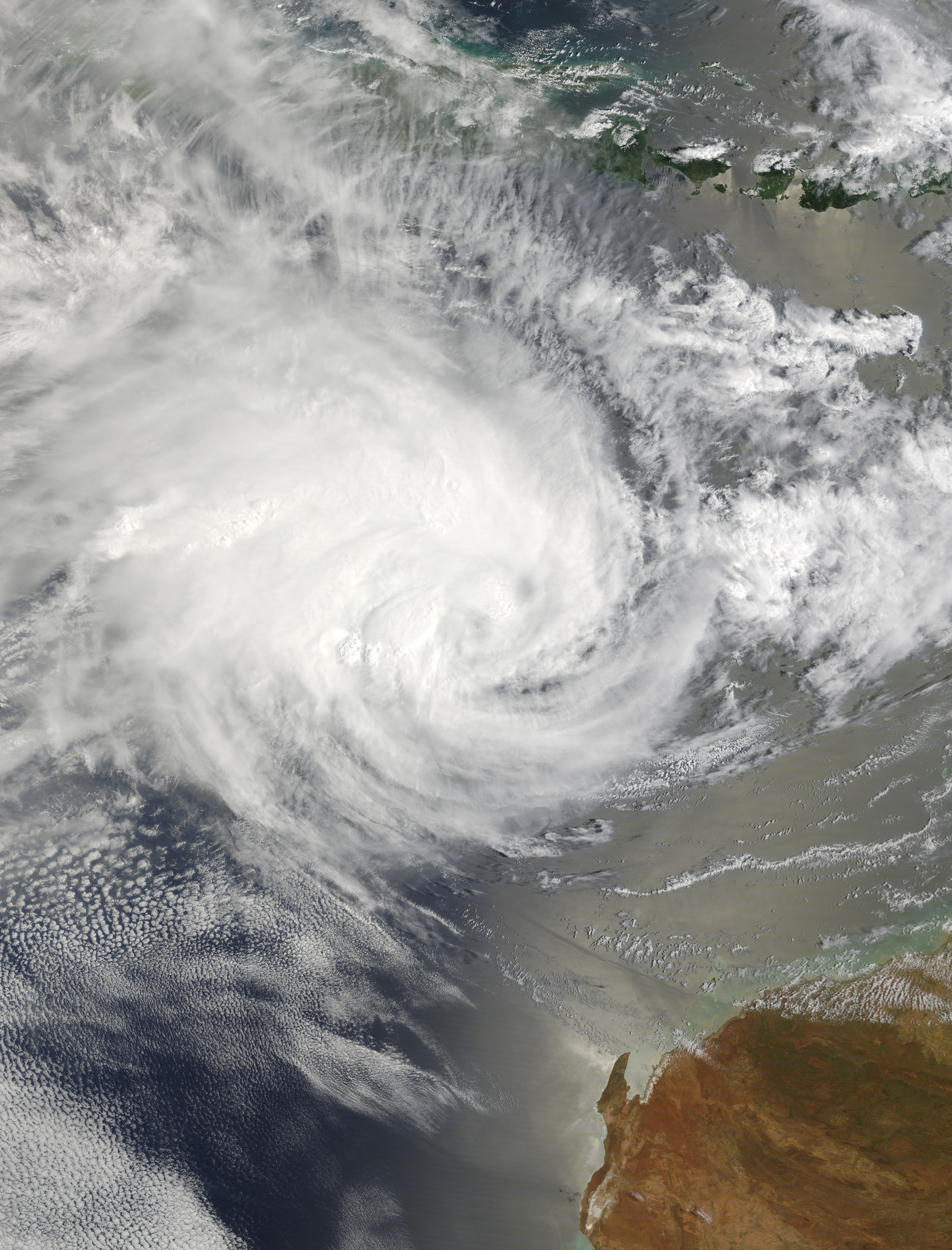
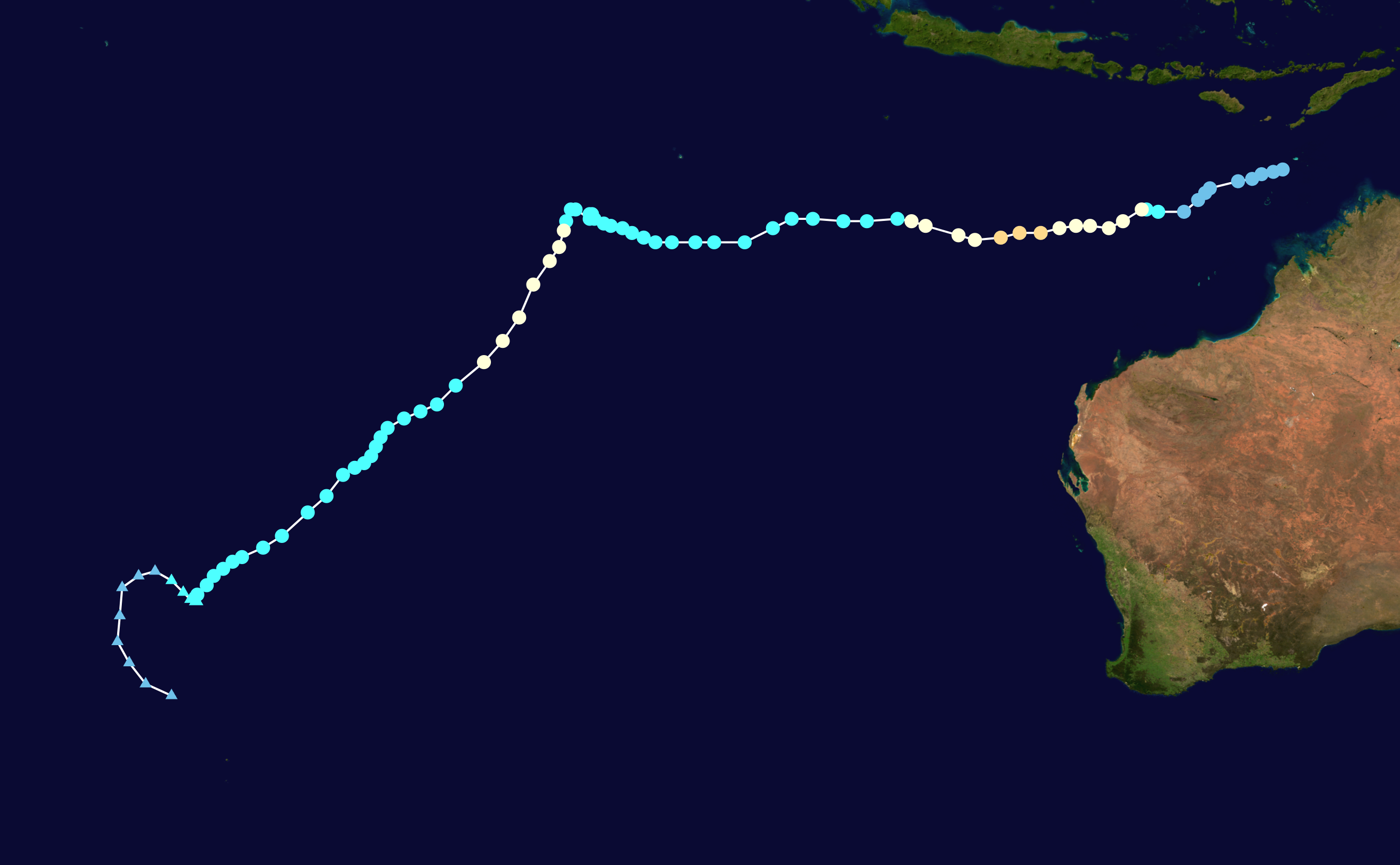
- Duration: 31 January – 12 February (Exited basin)
- Peak intensity: 140 km/h (85 mph) (10-min); 964 hPa (mbar)

A strong Madden–Julian oscillation (MJO) pulse, combined with the eastward-moving equatorial Rossby wave that spawned Severe Tropical Cyclone Sean, spawned a weak tropical low within a monsoon trough approximately 350 nautical miles (650 km) north-northwest of Broome on 31 January. As it moved westward within an environment of warm sea surface temperatures, low to moderate vertical wind shear, and moderate dual channel outflow aloft, the low quickly organized, with its centre becoming embedded within deep convection, prompting the JTWC to issue a TCFA by the next day. On 2 February, the system intensified into a category 1 tropical cyclone, with the BoM giving the name Taliah. The JTWC subsequently followed suit and upgraded Taliah to a tropical storm.

12 hours later, Taliah intensified into a category 2 tropical cyclone, with the JTWC upgrading the system to a Category 1-equivalent tropical cyclone late on the same day, as it formed a banding eye. Taliah's intensification then stalled as wind shear increased, before deep curved banding improved rapidly around the system, becoming a category 3 severe tropical cyclone at 12:00 UTC on 3 February. By the next day, Taliah reached its peak intensity, with the JTWC upgrading Taliah to a category 2-equivalent tropical cyclone.

Following its peak intensity, increasing wind shear and a dry air entrainment into the core of Taliah led to its weakening, prompting the JTWC to downgrade Taliah to a category 1-equivalent tropical cyclone late on the same day. By early 5 February, Taliah had weakened to a category 2 tropical cyclone. Throughout the day, the system struggled, with its centre becoming partially exposed due to the high easterly wind shear. As a result, the JTWC downgraded Taliah to a tropical storm late on the same day, as its centre became elongated. Taliah then further weakened to a category 1 tropical cyclone at 06:00 UTC on 6 February, before becoming a tropical low by the next day, although gale-force winds persisted but not halfway through the system.

Over the next few days, wind shear slowly decreased as Taliah continued westward, and by 10 February, Taliah had re-intensified into a category 1 tropical cyclone, with tighter spiral bands of convection evident near the system's centre. The system then further intensified into a category 2 tropical cyclone by the next day, based on synthetic-aperture radar. As a large, ragged eye soon formed, the JTWC upgraded Taliah to a category 1-equivalent tropical cyclone once again on 12 February, before it exited the Australian area of responsibility by 12:00 UTC that same day.

=== Severe Tropical Cyclone Vince ===
- Category 3 severe tropical cyclone (Australian scale)
- Category 2 tropical cyclone (SSHWS)
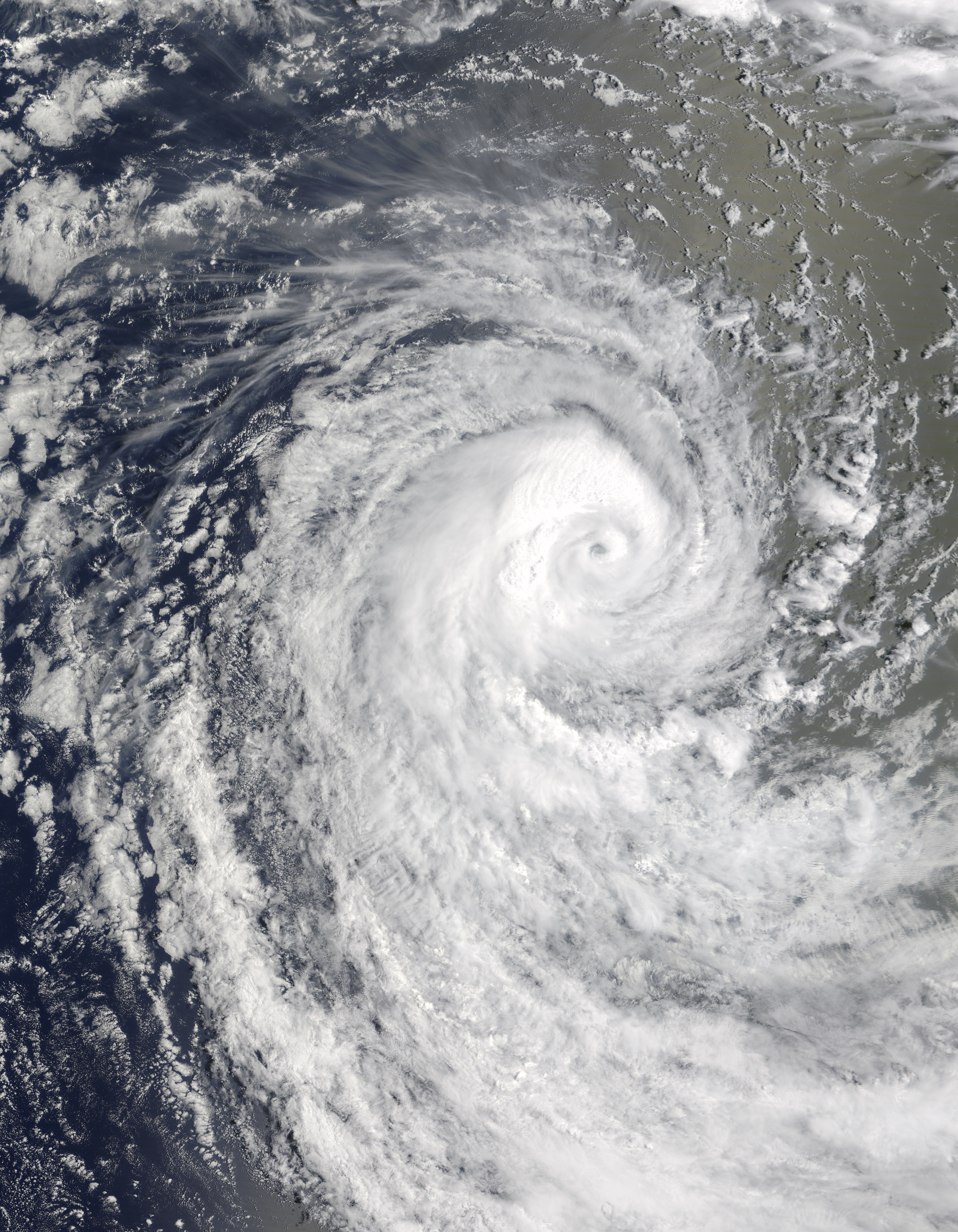
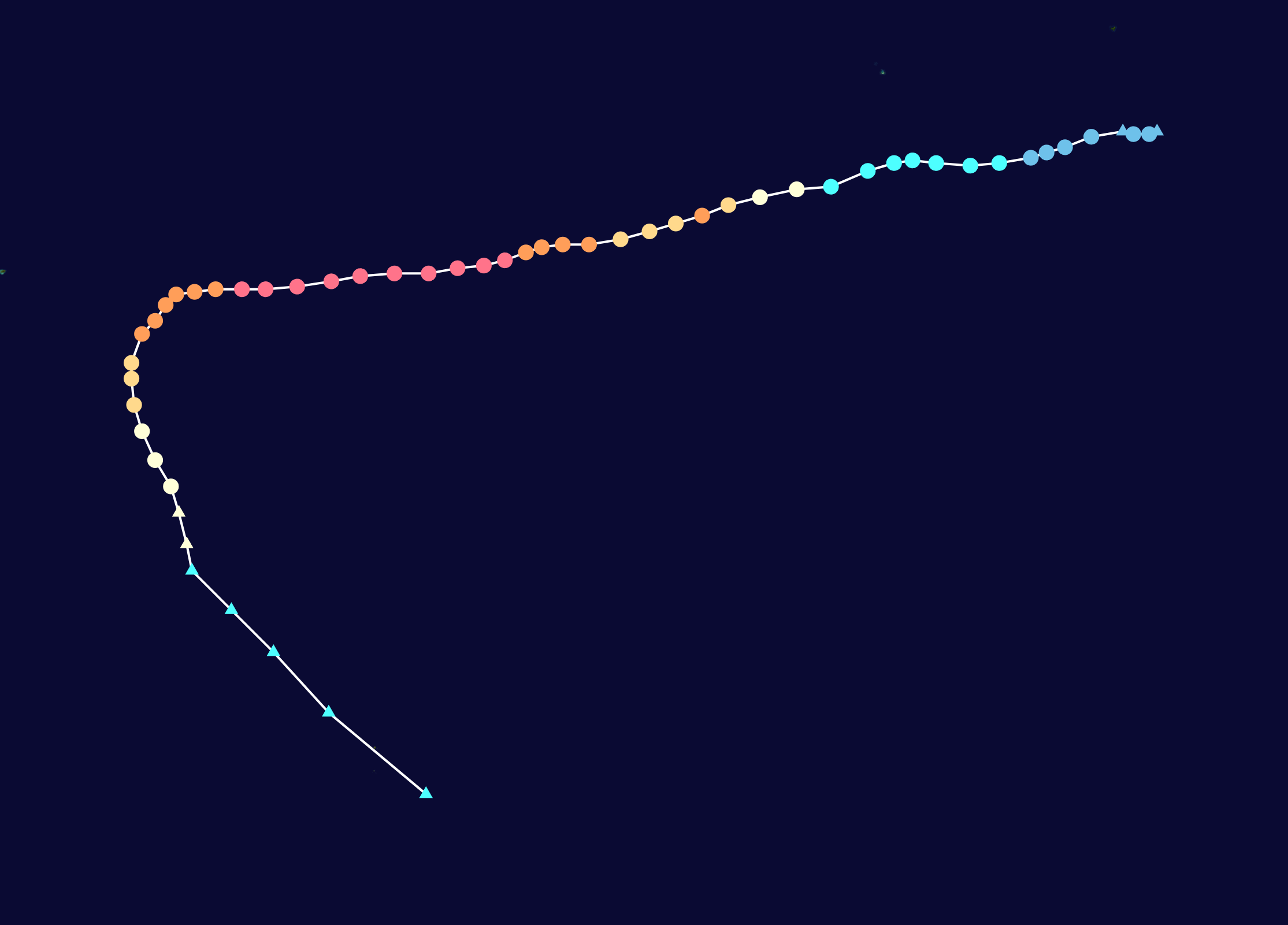
- Duration: 31 January – 4 February (Exited basin)
- Peak intensity: 140 km/h (85 mph) (10-min); 970 hPa (mbar)

On 31 January, both the BoM and JTWC reported that Tropical Low 15U had formed, aided by the MJO that also spawned Severe Tropical Cyclone Taliah, approximately 243 nautical miles (450 km) to the south-southeast of Christmas Island. Within an environment of warm sea surface temperatures, low to moderate vertical wind shear, and good poleward aloft, the system gradually organized, with deep convection forming near its centre, prompting the JTWC to issue a TCFA on 1 February. Late on the same day, the JTWC upgraded the system to a tropical storm, with an ASCAT pass indicating it had developed gale-force winds. The BoM would not follow suit until 12:00 UTC the next day, as gale-force winds extended more than halfway of its centre, becoming a category 1 tropical cyclone; however, it would not be named Vince until 3 February, when it already intensified into a category 2 tropical cyclone.

After it got named, Vince began to rapidly intensify, becoming a category 3 severe tropical cyclone by 12:00 UTC that same day, before it formed a pinhole eye by 4 February, prompting the JTWC to upgrade the system to a category 3-equivalent tropical cyclone. It then subsequently exited the Australian area of responsibility that same day.

=== Severe Tropical Cyclone Zelia ===
- Category 5 severe tropical cyclone (Australian scale)
- Category 4 tropical cyclone (SSHWS)
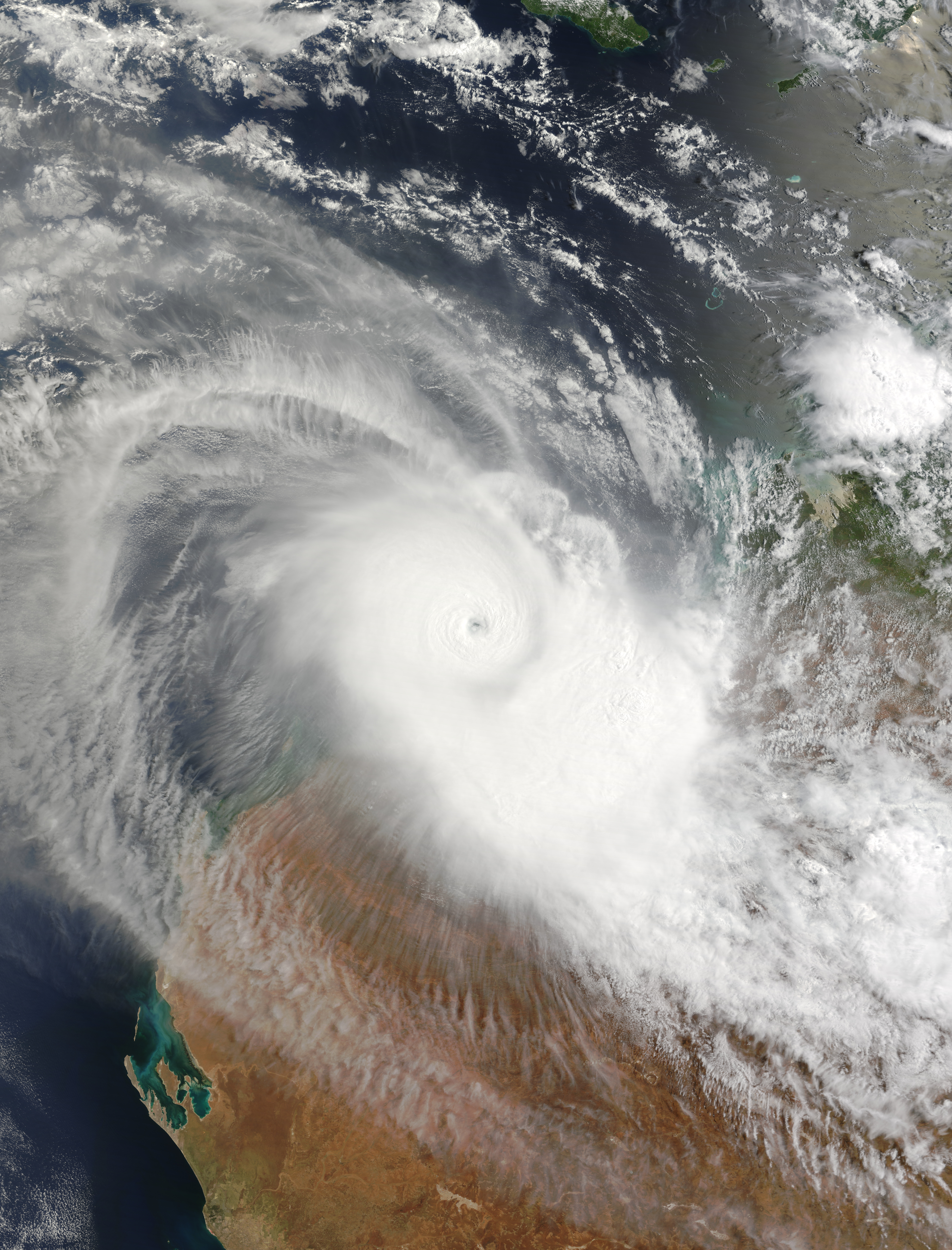
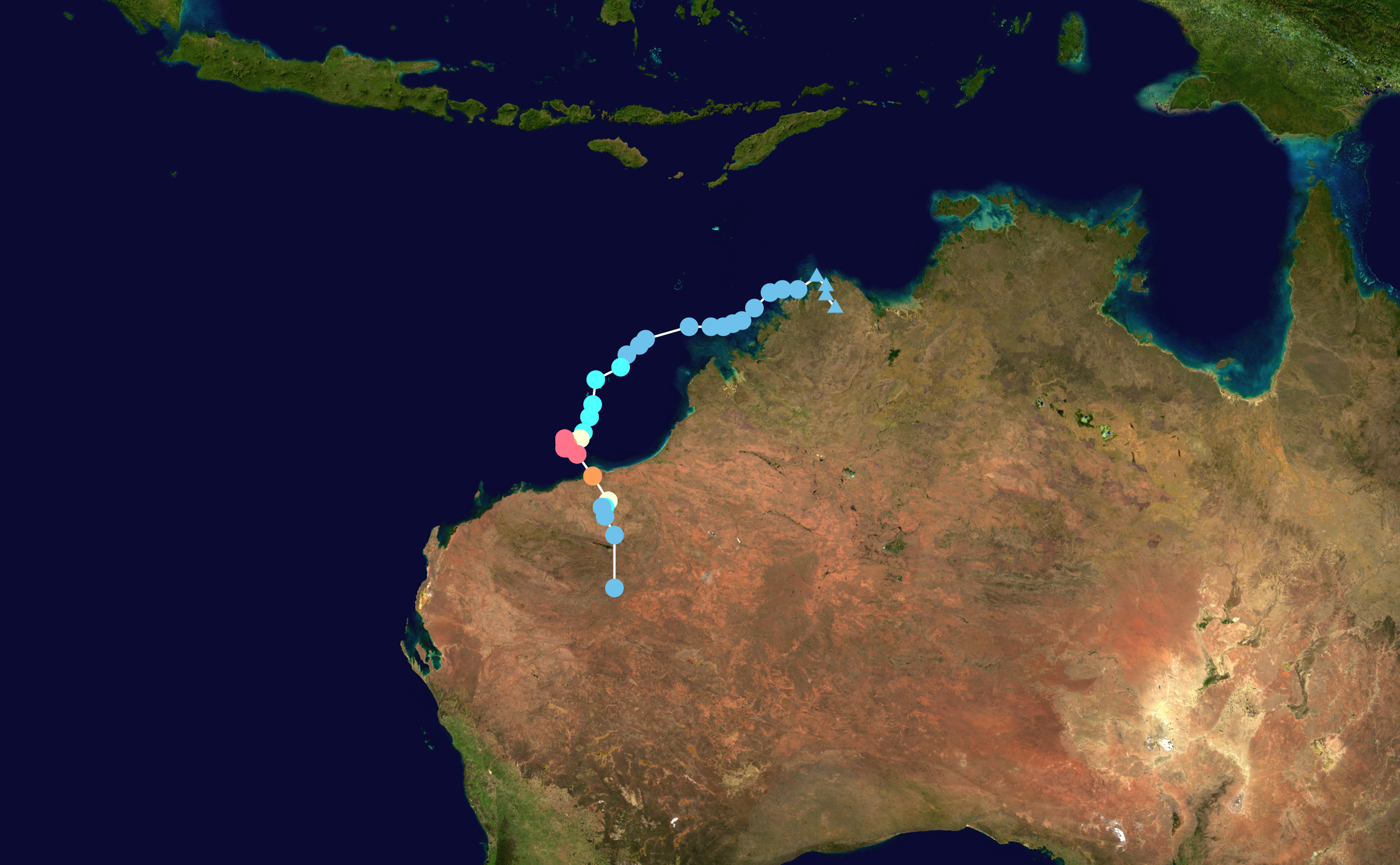
- Duration: 8 February – 14 February
- Peak intensity: 215 km/h (130 mph) (10-min); 927 hPa (mbar)

Tropical Low 18U formed on 8 February. It began tracking west-southwest, and was upgraded to a Category 1 system, named Zelia on 11 February. The storm then steadily intensified to become a Category 2 by the next morning. That night, the storm slowed, and began rapid intensification, to reach Category 4 status by 06:00 AWST on 13 February, and Category 5 status by 12:00 AWST that day. The storm then stalled and began an eyewall replacement cycle as shown by radar imagery, causing the rapid intensification phase to end. Increasing wind shear and the eyewall replacement cycle caused Zelia to peak with 10-minute sustained winds of 215 km/h (130 mph); a Category 5 on the Australian scale. On 14 February, Severe Tropical Cyclone Zelia made landfall at around 12:30 AWST in the afternoon near the De Grey River mouth, northeast of Port Hedland at Category 4 intensity. Zelia quickly weakened after landfall, and it dropped below tropical cyclone intensity later that day.

=== Severe Tropical Cyclone Bianca ===
- Category 4 severe tropical cyclone (Australian scale)
- Category 3 tropical cyclone (SSHWS)
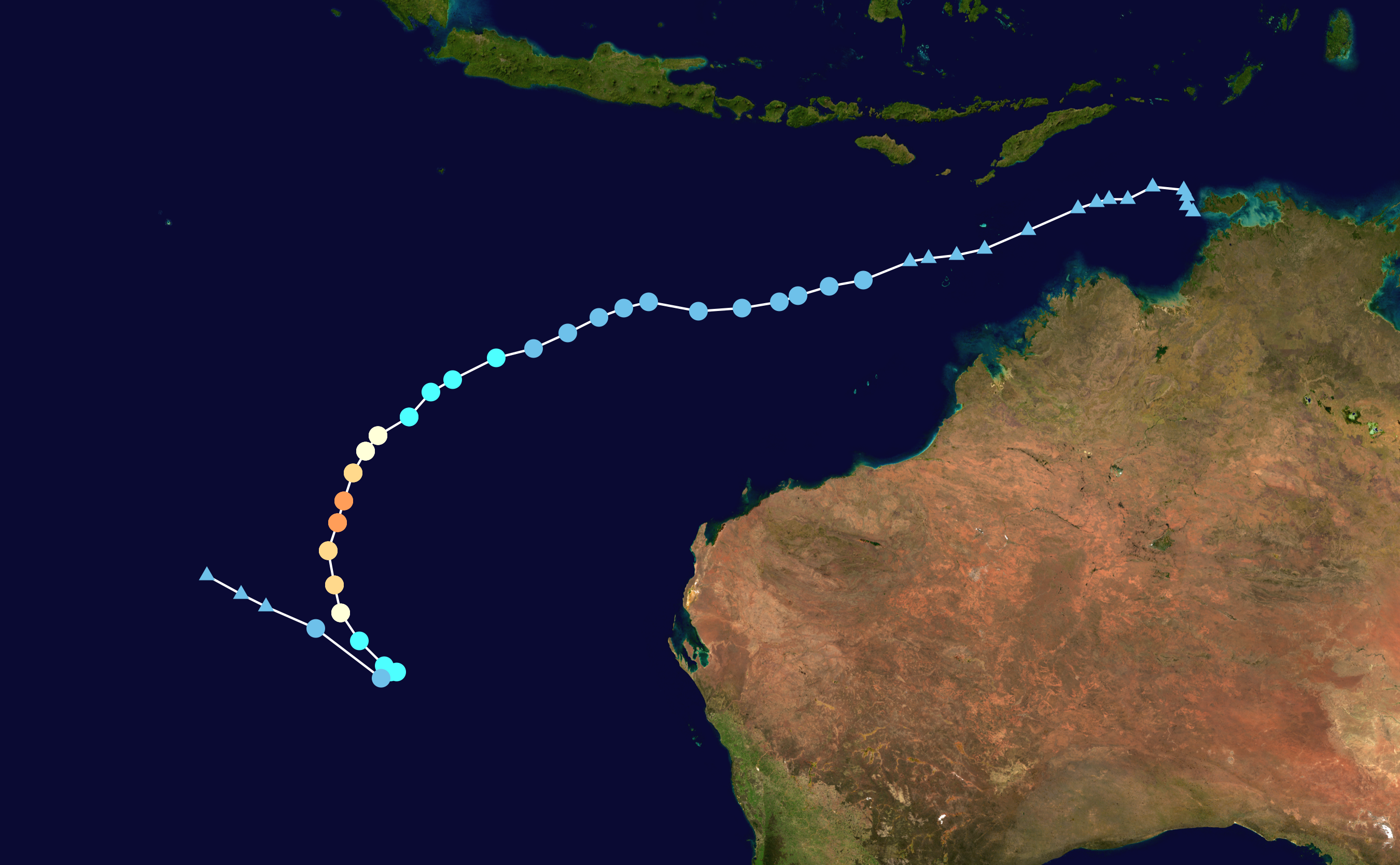
- Duration: 18 February – 27 February
- Peak intensity: 175 km/h (110 mph) (10-min); 954 hPa (mbar)

On 18 February, both the BoM and the JTWC reported that Tropical Low 21U had formed, associated with a trough, approximately 167 nautical miles (309 km) to the northwest of Darwin. Over the next few days, the low struggled to organize due to moderate to strong easterly vertical wind shear disrupting its structure, with scatterometer passes showing an elongated system. By 02:00 UTC on 23 February, the JTWC issued a TCFA on the system, as deep curved banding wrapped to the north of its consolidating centre. The low soon intensified into a category 1 tropical cyclone, with the BoM naming it as Bianca, and the JTWC designating it as 20S.

On the next day, the BoM reported that Bianca had further intensified into a category 2 tropical cyclone, with the JTWC upgrading the system to a category 1-equivalent tropical cyclone six hours later, as a cloud-filled ragged eye formed. Soon after, Bianca became a category 3 severe tropical cyclone, as its ragged eye soon cleared. The JTWC soon followed suit and upgraded Bianca to a category 2-equivalent tropical cyclone late on the same day. By 25 February, Bianca reached its peak intensity, as it became a category 4 severe tropical cyclone, with the JTWC estimating the system as a category 3-equivalent tropical cyclone.

After its peak intensity, wind shear soon increased as Bianca moved into lowering sea surface temperatures combined with a dry air intrusion, leading to its weakening to a category 3 severe tropical cyclone. The JTWC subsequently downgraded it to a category 2-equivalent tropical cyclone that same day, as the system increasingly became vertically misaligned. At 00:00 UTC on the next day, the BoM reported that Bianca had weakened to a category 2 tropical cyclone, with the JTWC following suit six hours later and downgrading the system to a tropical storm, as its centre became fully exposed. Bianca then further weakened into a category 1 tropical cyclone, before both the BoM and JTWC issued their final advisories on the system late on the same day, as it weakened below tropical cyclone intensity. Bianca then fully dissipated by 27 February, as it was absorbed into a broader southeasterly front.

=== Severe Tropical Cyclone Alfred ===
- Category 4 severe tropical cyclone (Australian scale)
- Category 4 tropical cyclone (SSHWS)
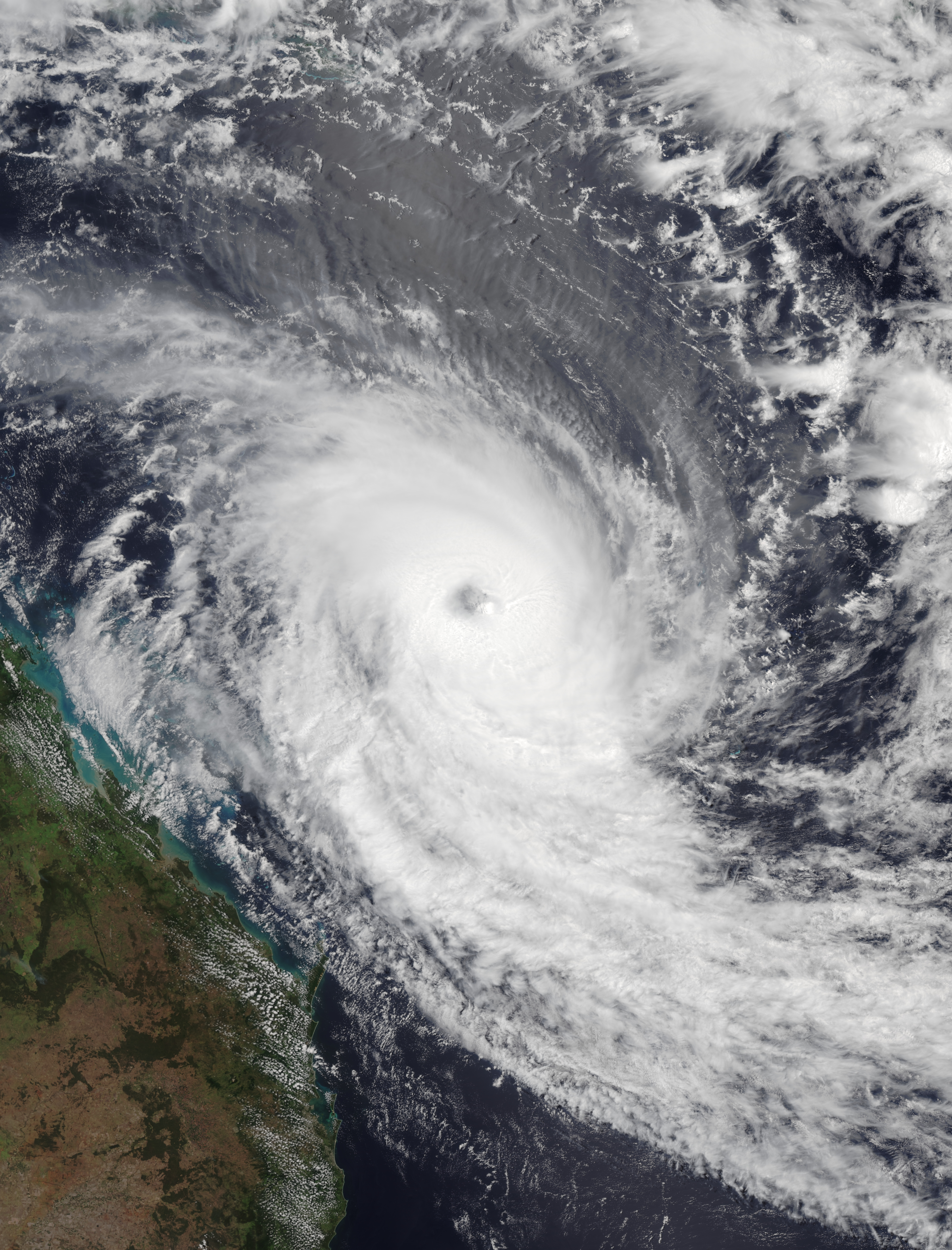
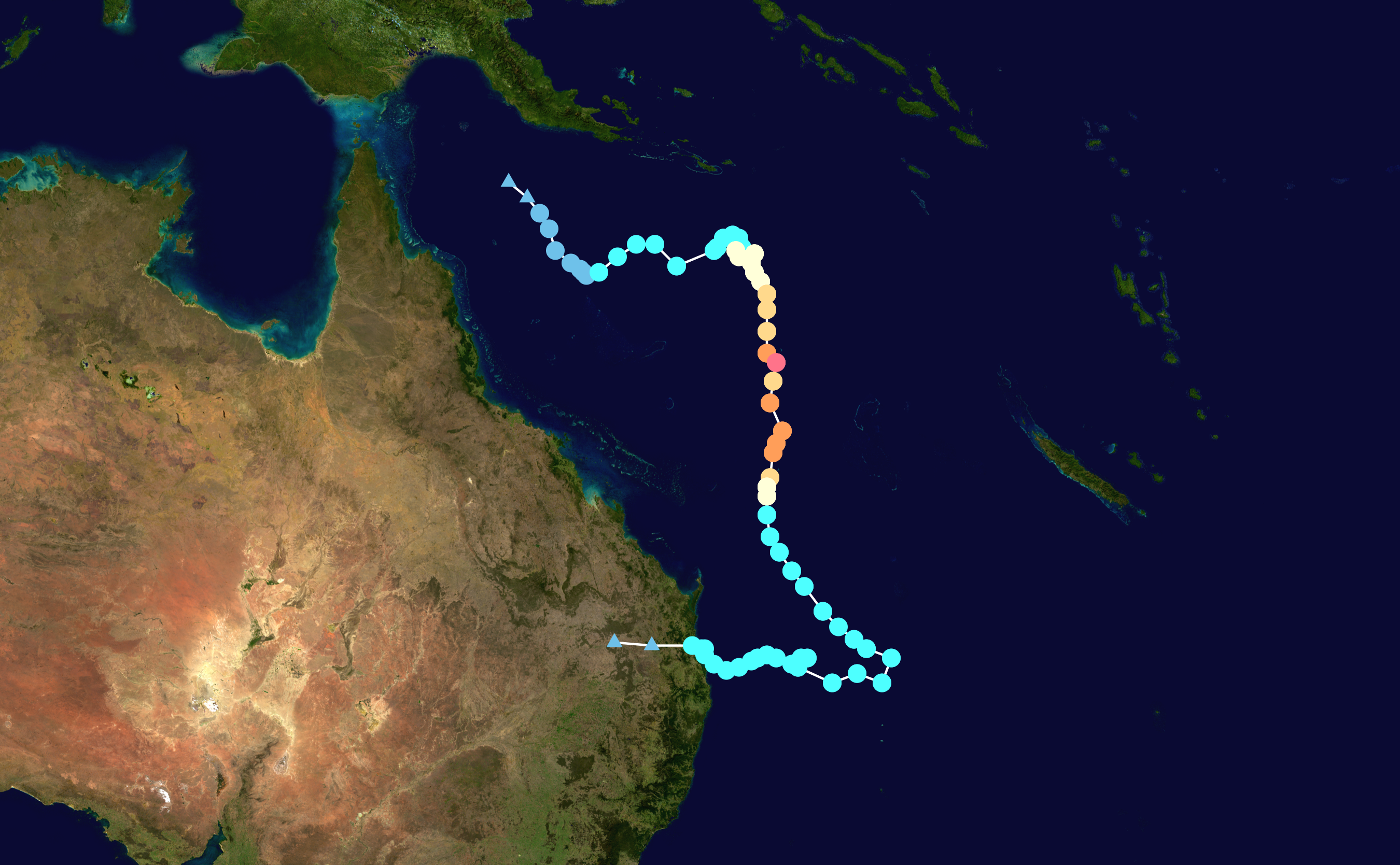
- Duration: 21 February – 8 March
- Peak intensity: 165 km/h (105 mph) (10-min); 954 hPa (mbar)

On 20 February, the BoM began to monitor Tropical Low 22U in the Coral Sea, and was noted to likely develop into a tropical cyclone over the next several days. Two days later, the JTWC upgraded the system to a tropical storm. Initially, the BoM did not immediately follow suit and kept it as a tropical low; however, at 06:00 UTC on 23 February, the BoM upgraded the system to a category 1, with the name Alfred being assigned to it.

Over the next couple of days, the storm continued to gradually move to the east, and was upgraded to a category 2 tropical cyclone in the Australian scale at 06:00 UTC on 24 February. As Alfred then turned south, it also continued to intensify, attaining category 3 status by 12:00 UTC on 26 February. The next day, the BoM further upgraded Alfred to a category 4 cyclone as a small eye appeared on visible satellite imagery. Later that night, its eye collapsed due to upwelling of cool water, prompting Alfred to fluctuate between Categories 3 and 4 on 28 February, before further weakening down to a Category 2 the following day. The cyclone then weakened to a category 1 tropical cyclone by 2 March, before restrengthening slightly to category 2 status late on the same day. On 3 March, Alfred transitioned into a subtropical cyclone, following an interaction with a subtropical jet stream. Despite this, environmental conditions became favourable for tropical re-development as the storm stalled off southeast Queensland coast on 5 March. The storm then began to regain its tropical characteristics and restrengthened into a category 2 system. Alfred then weakened to a Category 1 on 7 March. The cyclone then subsequently made landfall at Moreton Island, and was downgraded to a tropical low at 20:00 UTC that same day.

Beginning on 3 March, watches and warnings were issued in South East Queensland (SEQ) – including Brisbane – as Alfred posed a notable risk to the area, with all major forecast models having predicted an SEQ landfall between 6 and 8 March. A Cyclone Watch was issued between Sandy Cape, and Grafton, including Brisbane – the first for the city since a watch was briefly issued for Cyclone Oma in 2019, and the first to validate since Cyclone Nancy in 1990. The northeastern part of New South Wales (NSW) was also expected to be under a cyclone warning in preparation for the storm. Alfred caused an estimated US$1.36 billion economic loss.

=== Tropical Cyclone 25U ===
- Category 1 tropical cyclone (Australian scale)
- Tropical storm (SSHWS)
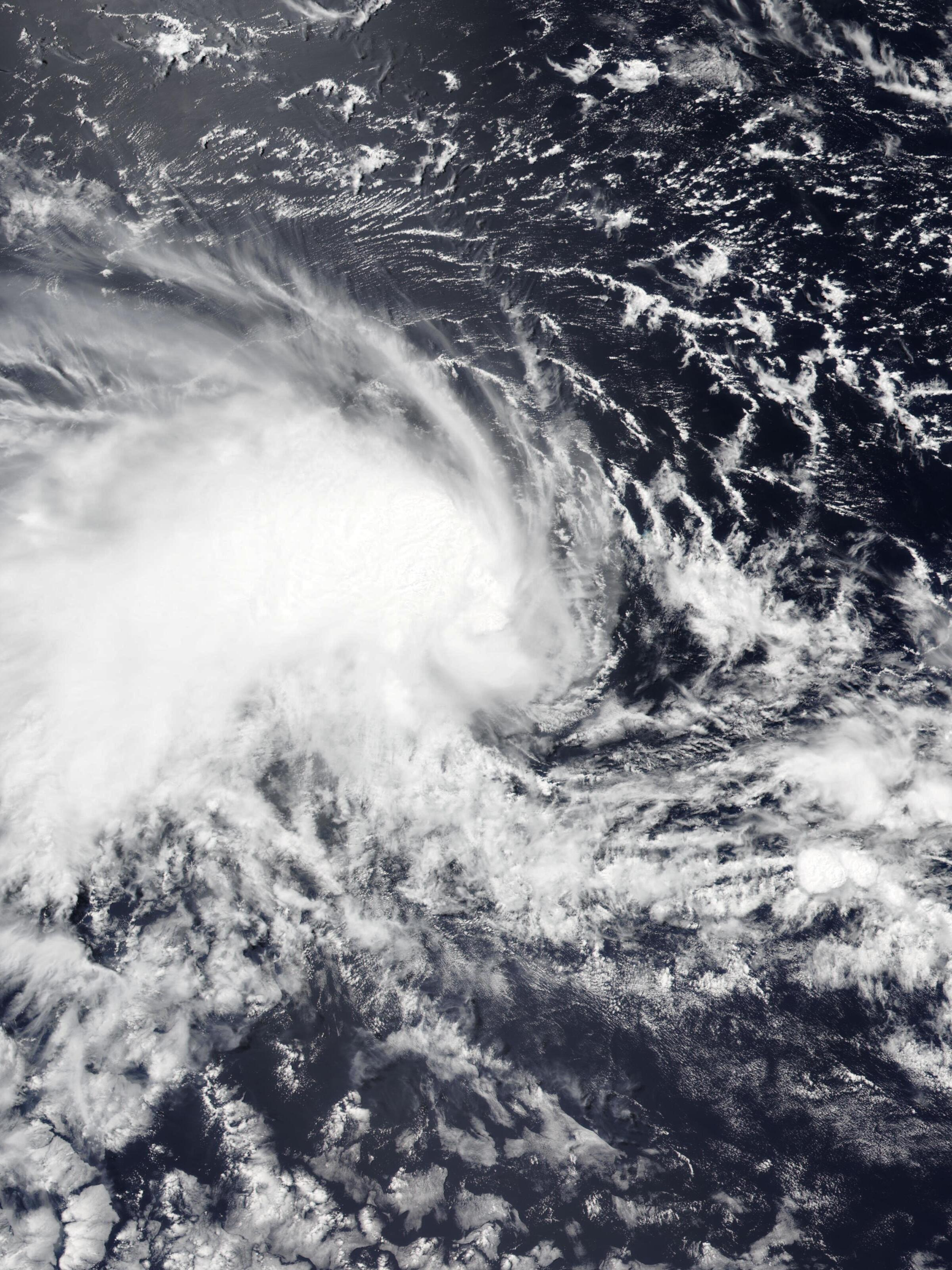
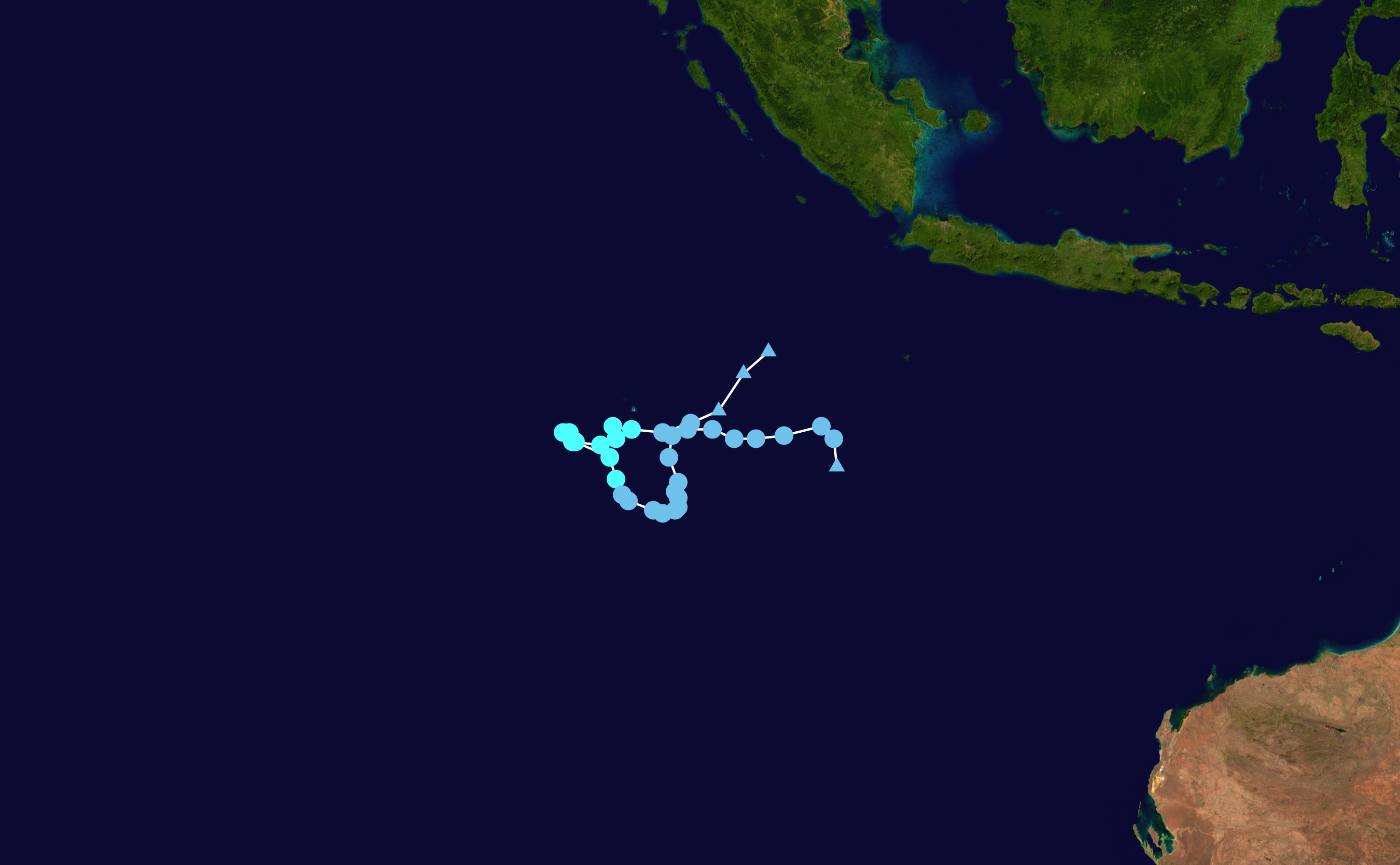
- Duration: 17 March – 21 March
- Peak intensity: 75 km/h (45 mph) (10-min); 998 hPa (mbar)

On 16 March, the BoM reported that Tropical Low 25U was forming in the Indian Ocean, between the Cocos (Keeling) Islands and Christmas Island. Over the next few days, the low steadily organized as it moved westward within an environment of warm sea surface temperatures, low vertical wind shear, and good poleward outflow aloft, prompting the JTWC to issue a TCFA by 18:00 UTC on 18 March. Three hours later, the JTWC upgraded the low to a tropical storm, designating it as 26S. The BoM did not follow suit however, as gales were only extending halfway of the system; upon reanalysis, gale-force winds extended more than halfway of 25U, meeting the bureau's criteria for tropical cyclone status. The cyclone then struggled as easterly wind shear caused by a mid-to-upper level ridge soon increased, with its centre becoming exposed and its convection being displaced to the west by 20 March. As a result, both the BoM and JTWC issued their final advisories on 25U late on the same day.

=== Severe Tropical Cyclone Courtney ===
- Category 5 severe tropical cyclone (Australian scale)
- Category 4 tropical cyclone (SSHWS)
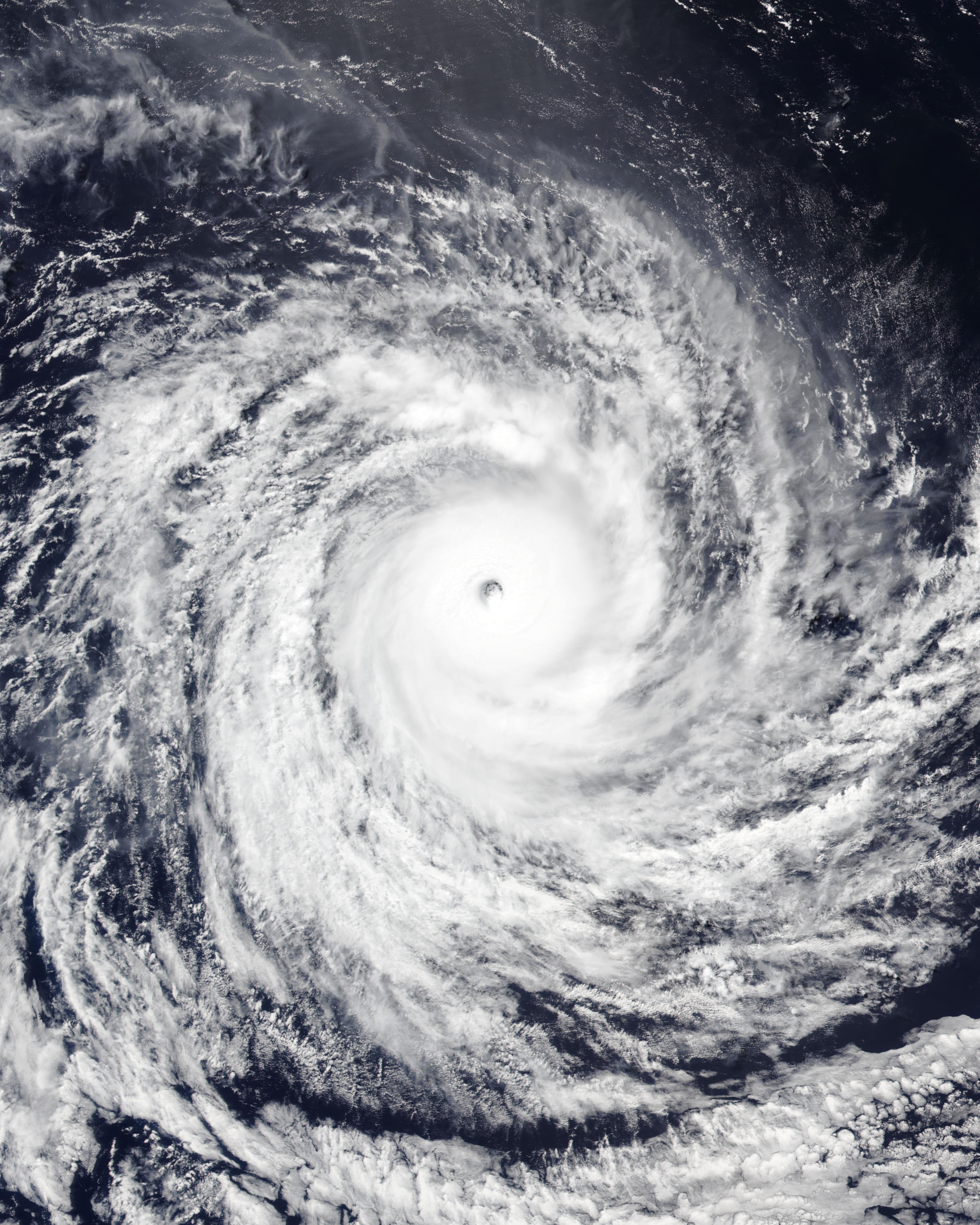
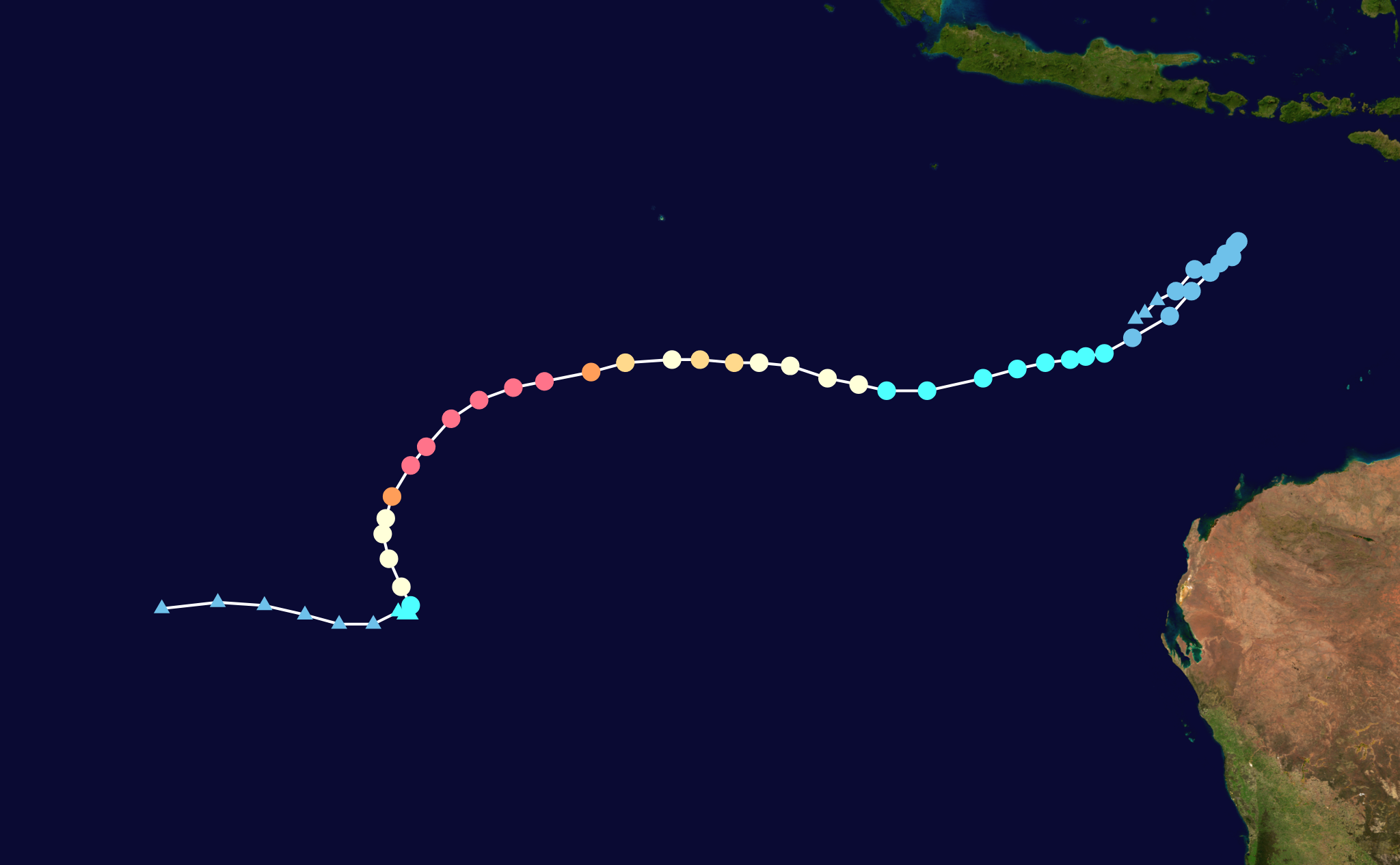
- Duration: 22 March – 29 March (Exited basin)
- Peak intensity: 205 km/h (125 mph) (10-min); 934 hPa (mbar)

During the second half of March, an active phase of the MJO affected Western Australian longitudes. Combined with a monsoon trough extending from the eastern Indian Ocean across northern Australia, it led to the BoM noting that a tropical low could form to the northwest of the Pilbara region in the next 7 days on 16 March, pre-designating it as 27U. This came into fruition six days later, when both the BoM and JTWC reported that the low had formed approximately 530 nautical miles (980 km) to the north of Learmonth. Within an environment of warm sea surface temperatures, low to moderate vertical wind shear, and moderate poleward outflow, the low gradually organized, prompting the JTWC to issue a TCFA late on 23 March. By the next day, the JTWC upgraded 27U into a tropical storm, although convection was sheared to the west of the system's centre. The BoM did not follow suit, however, as gales were only confined in the southwest quadrant. Late on 25 March, the BoM reported that it had intensified into a category 1 tropical cyclone, earning the name Courtney.

By the next day, Courtney intensified into a category 2 tropical cyclone as wind shear decreased, before both the BoM and JTWC reported that Courtney had further intensified into a category 3 severe tropical cyclone and a category 1-equivalent tropical cyclone, respectively, late on the same day. Courtney's intensification then slowed by 27 March, before the JTWC reported that Courtney had become a category 2-equivalent tropical cyclone late on the same day. By the next day, Courtney began rapidly intensifying, as it formed a pinhole eye, prompting the JTWC to upgrade the system to a category 3-equivalent tropical cyclone, before further intensifying to a category 4 severe tropical cyclone late on the same day. It then reached its peak intensity as a category 5 severe tropical cyclone at 12:00 UTC on 29 March, before subsequently exiting the Australian area of responsibility.

=== Tropical Cyclone Dianne ===
- Category 2 tropical cyclone (Australian scale)
- Tropical storm (SSHWS)
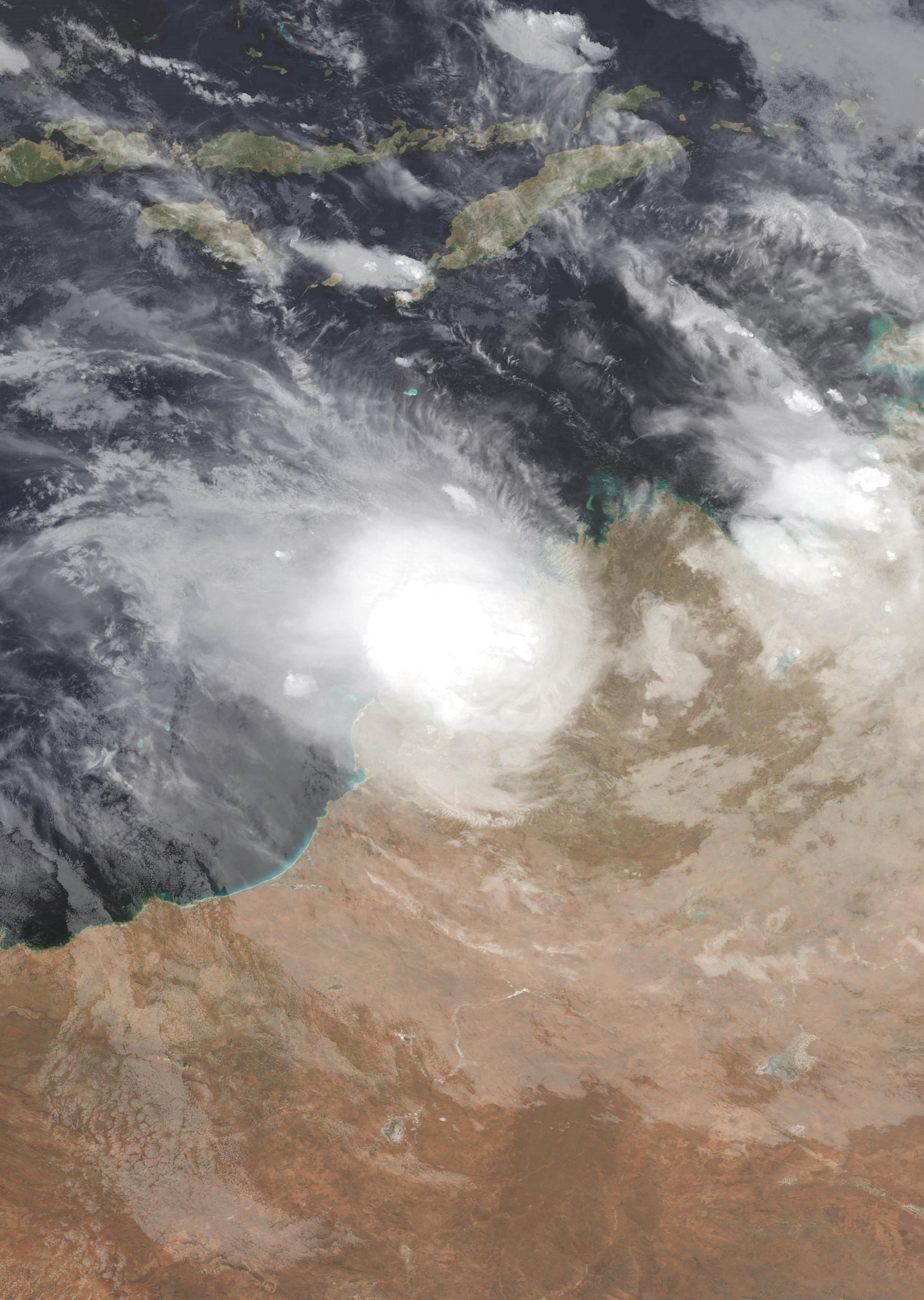
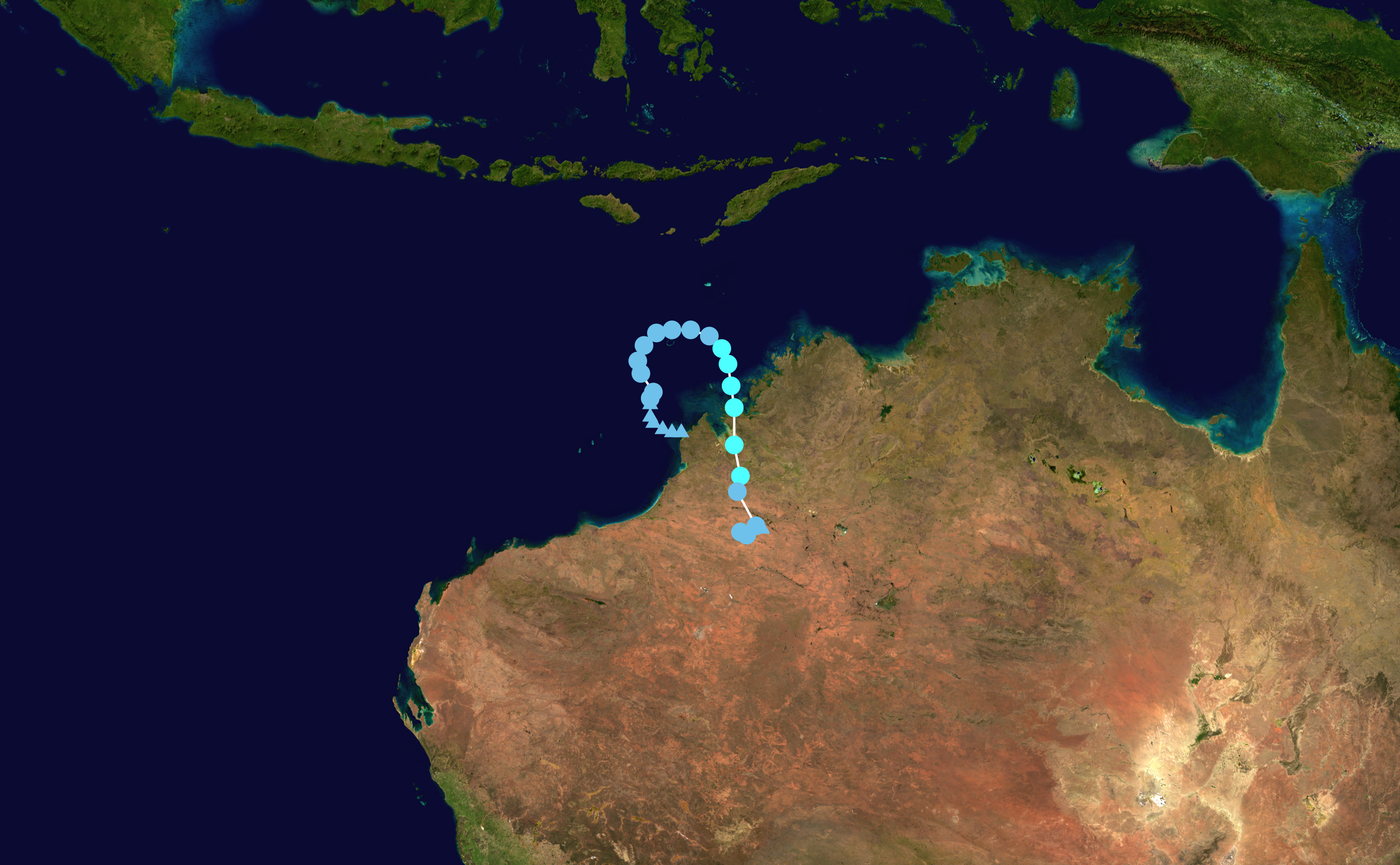
- Duration: 26 March – 29 March
- Peak intensity: 95 km/h (60 mph) (10-min); 984 hPa (mbar)

On 25 March, the BoM began to note that a tropical low, pre-designated as 28U, could form off the northwest coast of the Kimberley region, associated with the active MJO and within the monsoon trough that also spawned Severe Tropical Cyclone Courtney. Aided by the passage of an equatorial Rossby wave, the tropical low then formed late on 26 March, with the JTWC issuing a TCFA on the low by 05:00 UTC on the next day, as very intense deep convection was being sheared to the west of the system's centre. Within an environment of warm sea surface temperatures and low vertical wind shear, the convection gradually wrapped into the system's centre, becoming Tropical Cyclone Dianne by 28 March. Turning south, Dianne quickly strengthened into a category 2 tropical cyclone, before making landfall near Koolan Island late on the same day at the same intensity. As a result, the JTWC issued their final advisory on the system. Dianne subsequently weakened into a tropical low by the next day, before completely dissipating by 30 March.

130 mm of rain fell in Derby, causing street flooding. Damage totaled to AU$600,000 (US$430,000).

=== Severe Tropical Cyclone Errol ===
- Category 5 severe tropical cyclone (Australian scale)
- Category 5 tropical cyclone (SSHWS)
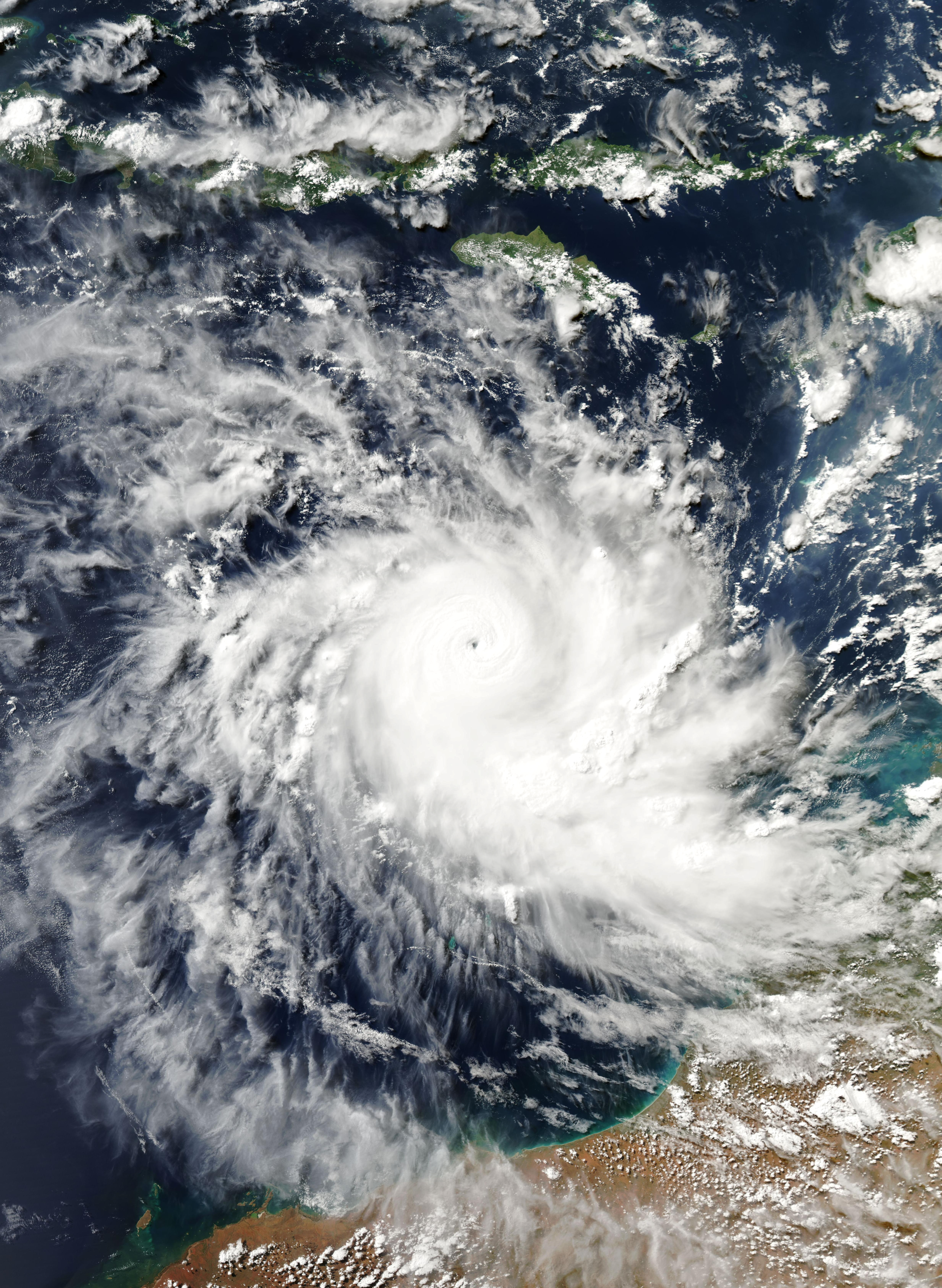
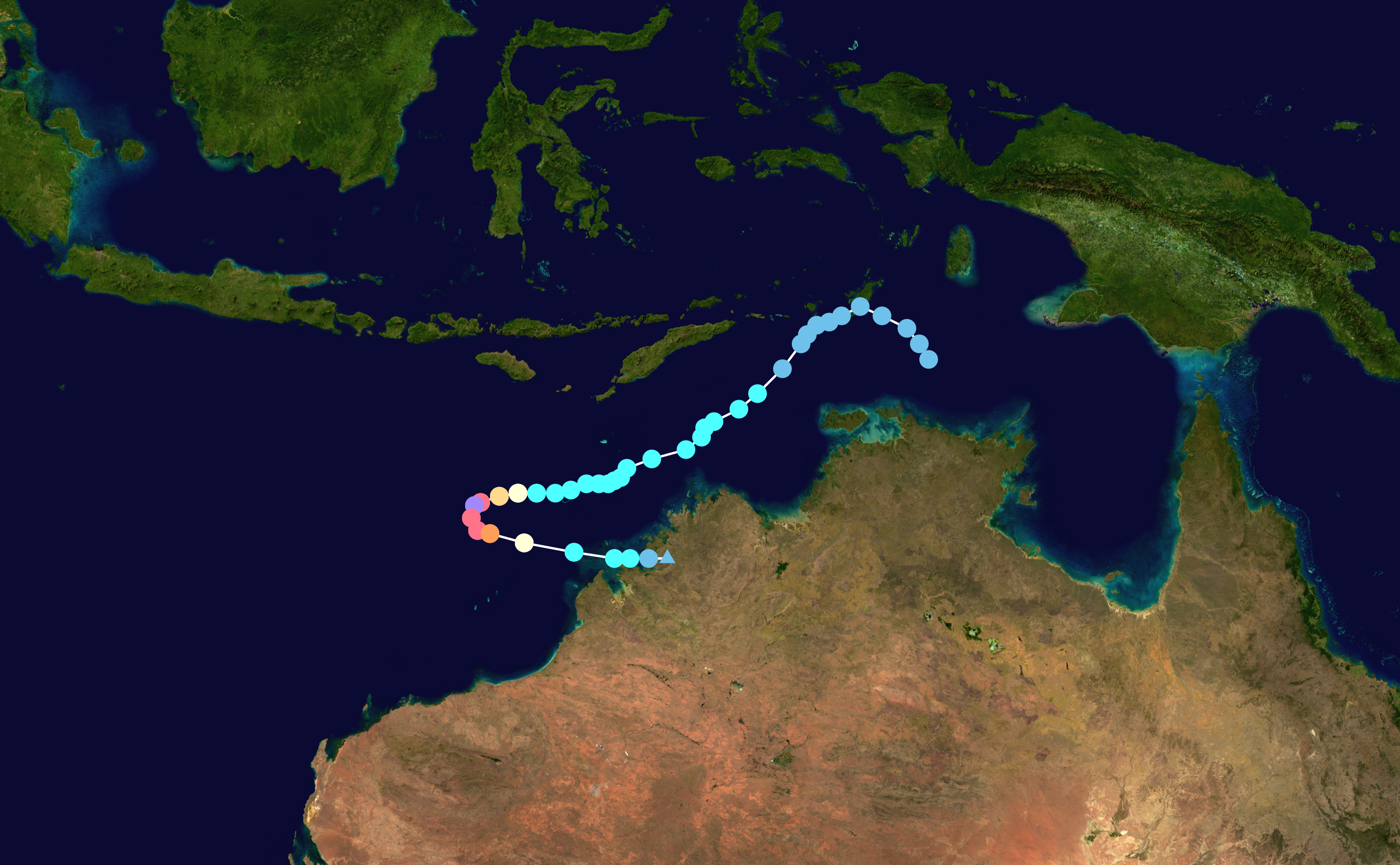
- Duration: 9 April – 18 April
- Peak intensity: 205 km/h (125 mph) (10-min); 936 hPa (mbar)

An active burst of the equatorial Rossby wave led to the formation of a Tropical Low in the Arafura Sea on 9 April. The low, designated 29U by the Bureau of Meteorology (BoM), slowly moved south-westwards in the east Indian Ocean, as convection persisted near the system's circulation. The storm's intensity fluctuated from 12 April to 14 April, although it remained below category 1 status. On 15 April, the BoM upgraded the system to a Category 1, assigning the name Errol. The newly named cyclone soon began a period of explosive deepening; the storm's 1-minute sustained winds increased from 100 km/h (65 mph) to 260 km/h (160 mph) in 24 hours. Errol's intensification was described by the JTWC as 'explosive and extreme'. The storm also displayed a well-established pinhole eye. Early on 16 April, Errol reached its peak intensity as a Category 5 equivalent tropical cyclone with 1-minute sustained winds of 260 km/h (160 mph), according to JTWC, while the BOM estimated 10-minute sustained winds of 205 km/h (125 mph) which made it a Category 5 severe tropical cyclone. Originally, it was estimated as a high-end Category 4 severe tropical cyclone with 10-minute sustained winds of 185 km/h (115 mph) due to limitations of the Dvorak technique, however, during post-analysis, it was determined that Errol briefly peaked as a category 5 severe tropical cyclone. Later that day, Errol underwent an eyewall replacement cycle as it initiated a turn towards the Kimberley coast. On 17 April, as the storm moved east-southeasterly, wind shear increased to 50 knots. The more hostile conditions caused Errol to rapidly weaken, eventually becoming a tropical low on 18 April before it made landfall between Derby and Kuri Bay. The BoM ceased advisories on the system after it made landfall.

Errol was a small tropical cyclone that brought heavy rain to the Northern Kimberley coast including Derby and Kalumburu on 18 and 19 April. The cyclone crossed over Adele Island shortly before making landfall north of Kimberley on the Australian mainland. The weather station on the island recorded a peak wind gust up to 102 km/h. Kalumburu received 160.8 millimetres (6.33 in) of rainfall in 24 hours. Errol is the latest tropical cyclone to form or move into the Australian region since Cyclone Karim which formed on 7 May 2022.

Errol is the strongest storm of this cyclone season.

=== Tropical Low 30U ===
- Tropical low (Australian scale)
- Tropical storm (SSHWS)
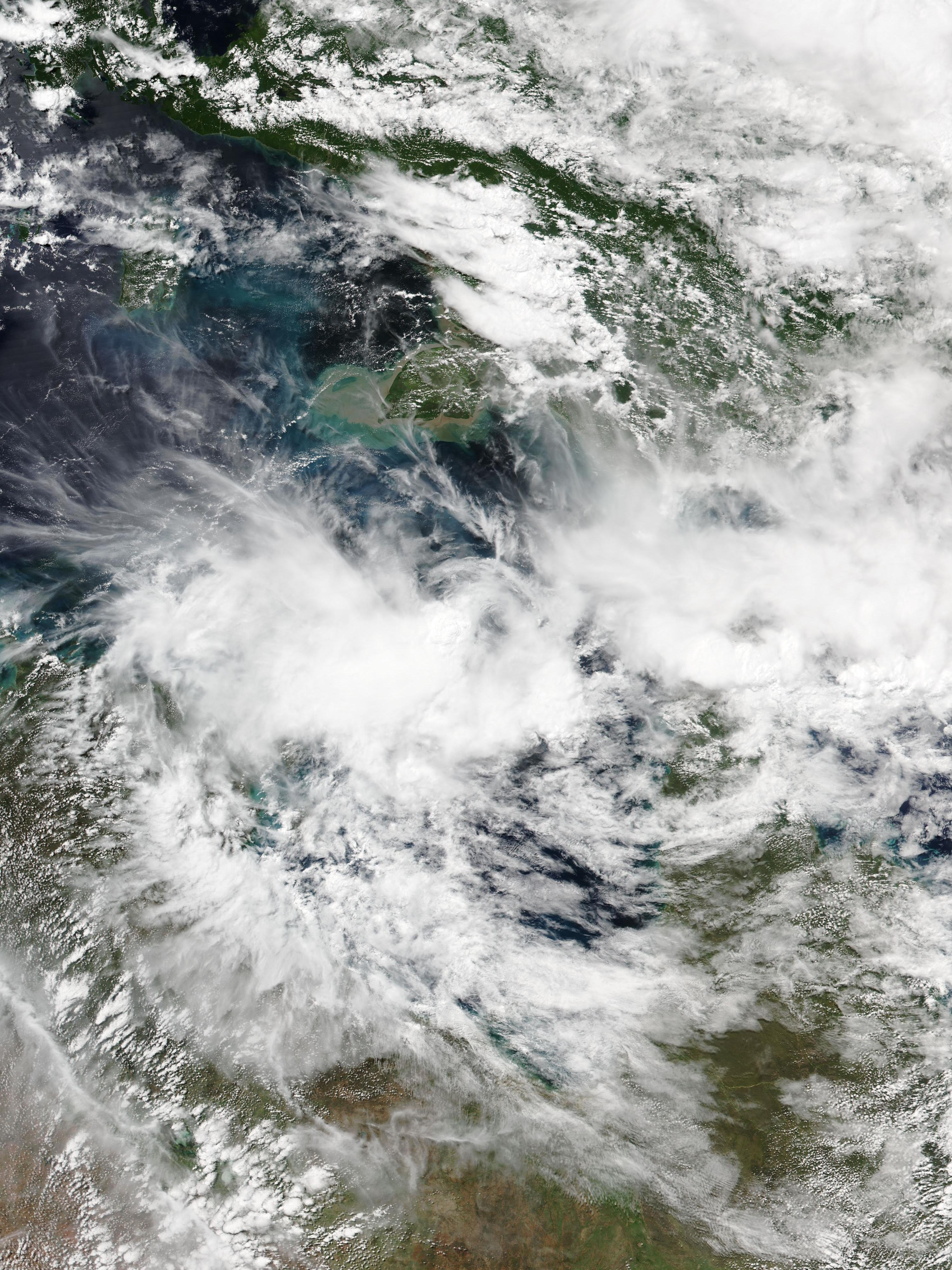
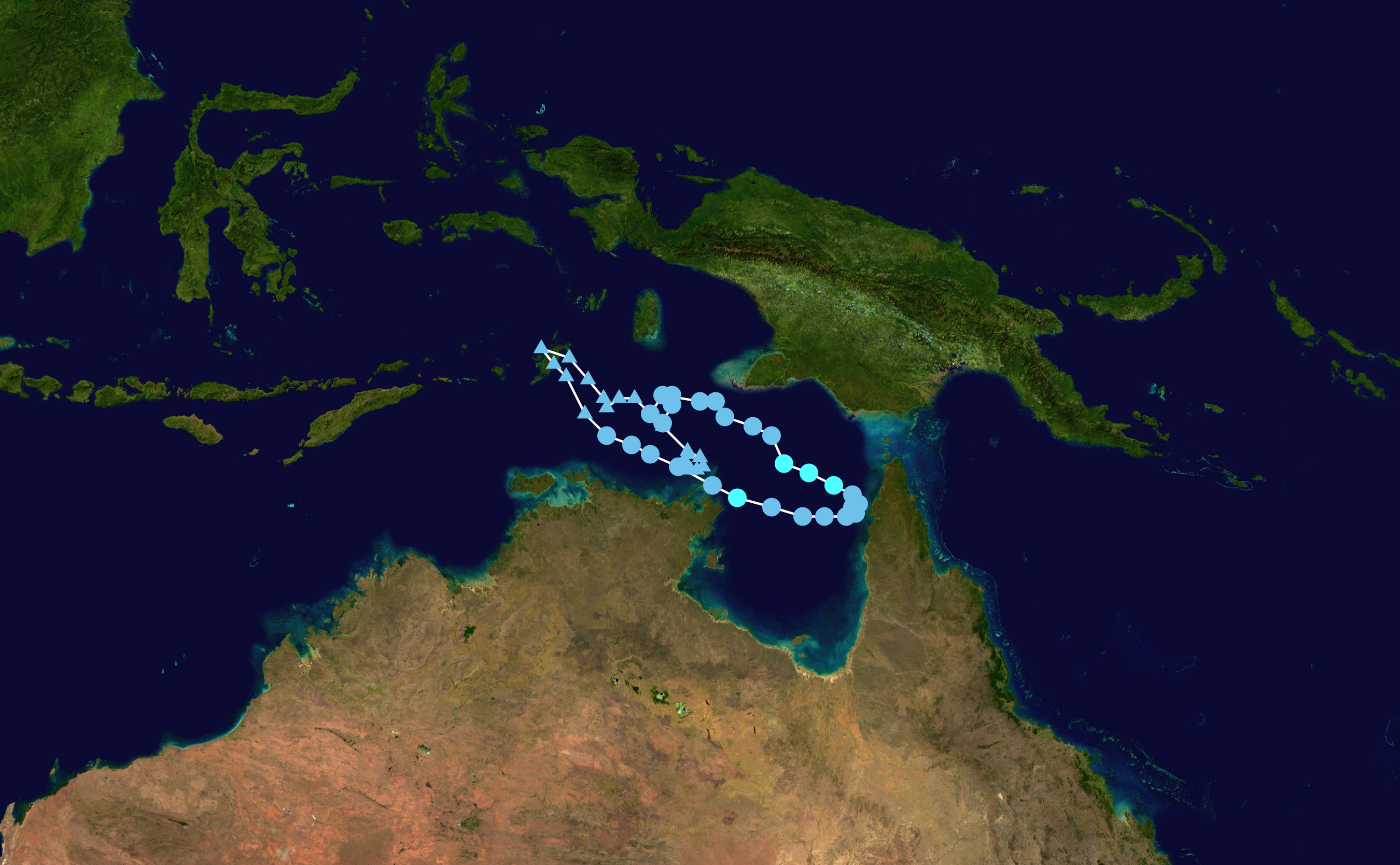
- Duration: 13 April – 23 April
- Peak intensity: 65 km/h (40 mph) (10-min); 998 hPa (mbar)

On 11 April, the BoM began to note that a tropical low may form between the Arafura Sea and the Gulf of Carpentaria, and pre-designated it as 30U. This came into fruition five days later, when both the BoM and the JTWC reported that the low had formed approximately 337 nautical miles (624 km) to the northeast of Darwin. Within an increasingly favorable environment of warm sea surface temperatures, lowering vertical wind shear and increasing poleward outflow, its centre began to consolidate, prompting the JTWC to issue a TCFA late on 17 April, before upgrading the system to a tropical storm on the next day. The BoM did not follow suit, however, as gales were only extending halfway of the system. 30U then weakened to a tropical depression late on the same day, as its centre became partially exposed due to increasing wind shear and a dry air intrusion. Moving westward, the system remained weak, before the JTWC briefly upgraded 30U to a tropical storm once again on 21 March. It subsequently weakened to a tropical depression once again, as its centre became fully exposed. The JTWC then issued their final advisory on 30U by the next day, as the system further deteriorated. The BoM subsequently followed suit and stopped monitoring the system late on the same day.

=== Tropical Low 33U ===
- Tropical low (Australian scale)
- Tropical storm (SSHWS)
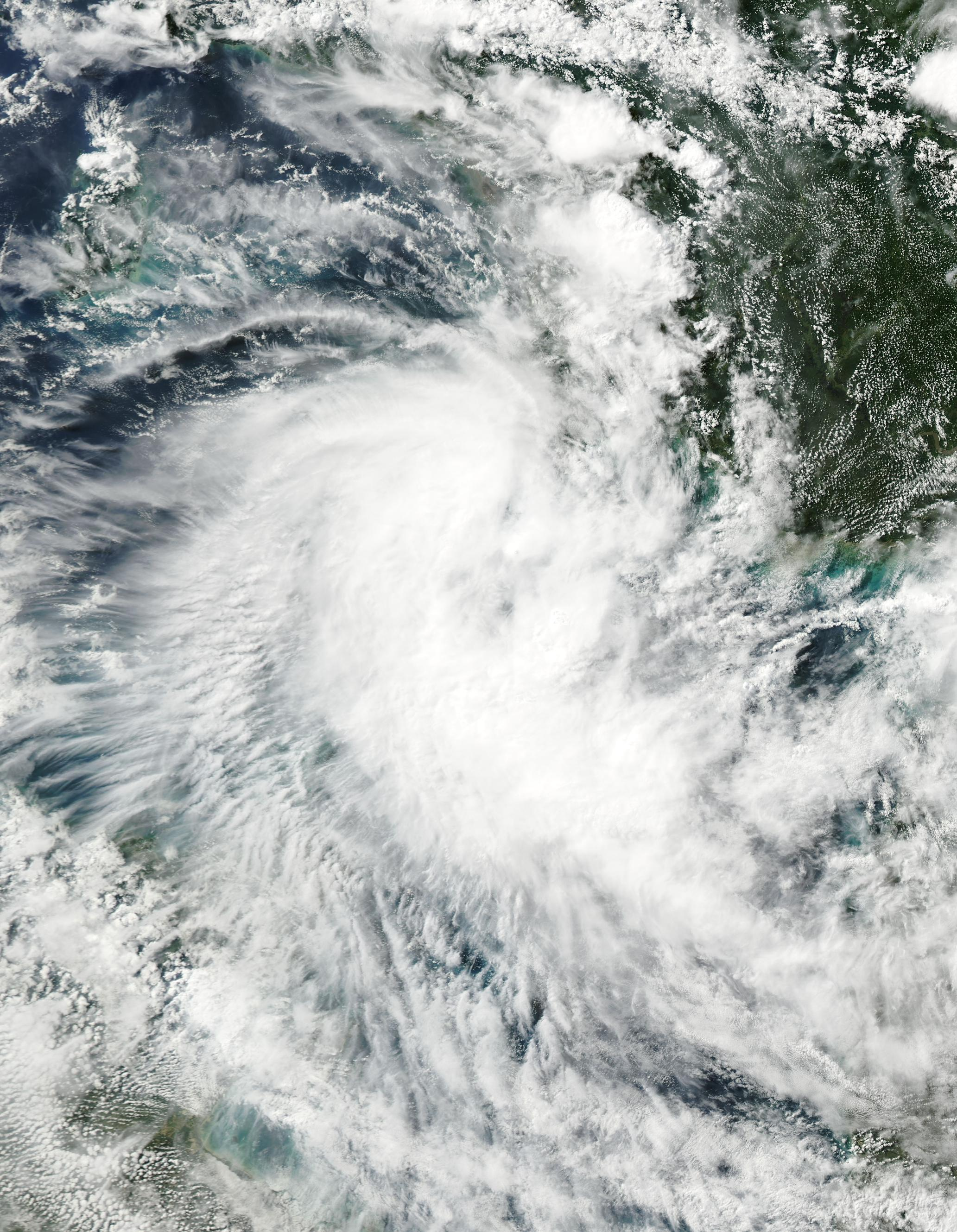
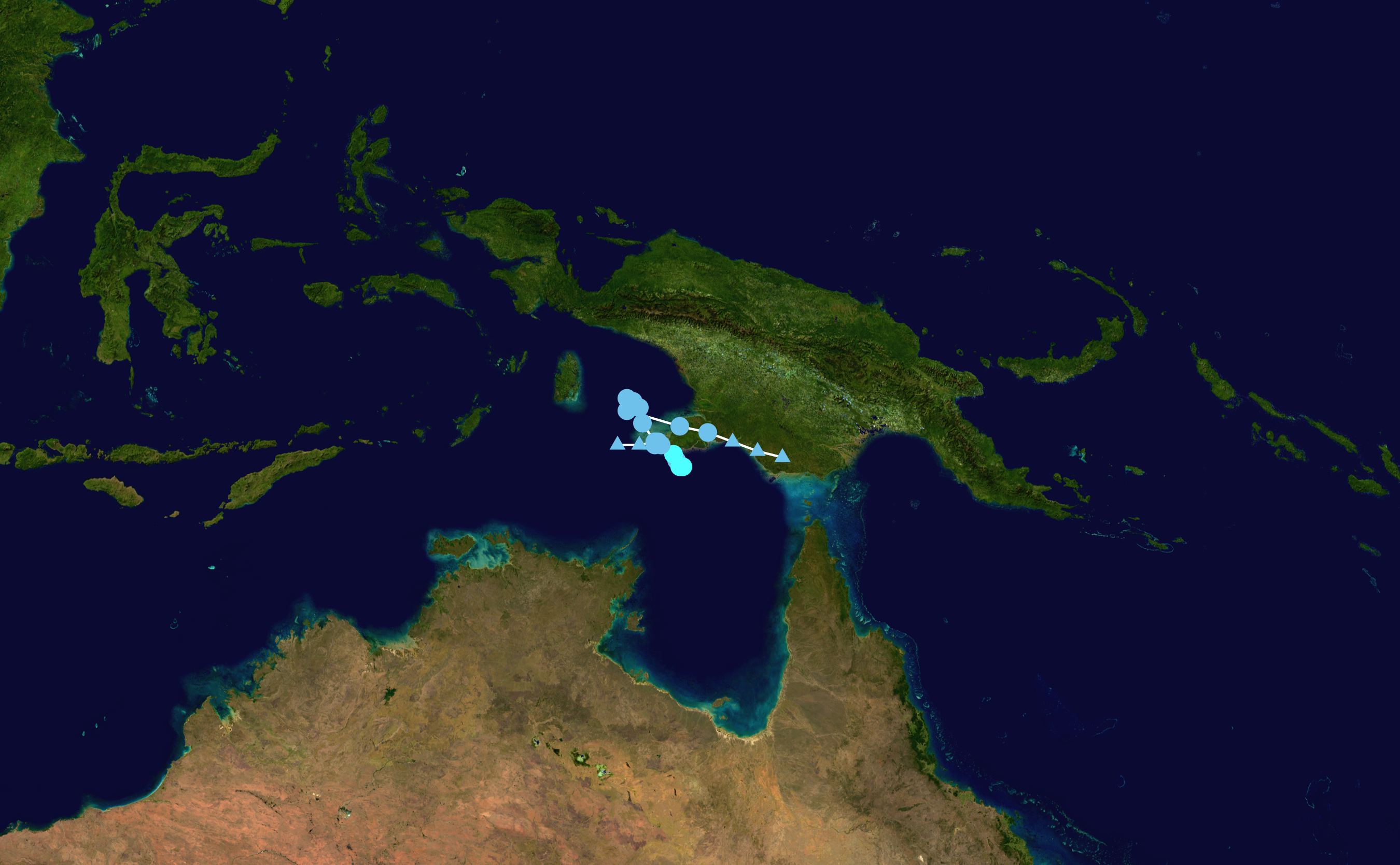
- Duration: 9 May – 12 May
- Peak intensity: 65 km/h (40 mph) (10-min); 1000 hPa (mbar)

On 8 May, the JTWC reported that an area of convection had formed approximately 228 nautical miles (422 km) to the north of Weipa. At the time, it had a broad but organizing centre, and was within a marginal environment of warm sea surface temperatures, low vertical wind shear, and good poleward outflow offset by its proximity near land. By the next day, the BoM designated the low as 33U. The system then slowly organized as it moved southwestward, with the JTWC issuing a TCFA late on 10 March. By the next day, the JTWC upgraded 33U into a tropical storm; however, the BoM did not follow suit, as gale-force winds did not extend halfway through the system. The system then began to weaken, as its centre became tilted, along with a dry air intrusion. As a result, the JTWC issued their final advisory on 33U by 12 May, with the BoM subsequently following suit six hours later.

=== Other systems ===
- Tropical Low 04U formed to the north of the Cocos (Keeling) Islands on 7 December. After heading westward for most of its lifetime, it dissipated on 11 December. The storm caused floods and landslides in Sukabumi Regency, West Java, killing eight people and leaving seven others missing, with one home destroyed and 39 others damaged in the regency. Flooding also killed three people in Lebak Regency, Banten.
- On 9 December, the BoM reported that Tropical Low 02U formed to the north of the Pilbara coast. The system moved generally westward before dissipating on 12 December.
- At 9 a.m. on 21 December, a low pressure system formed in the Coral Sea, and the Joint Typhoon Warning Center labeled the disturbance 96P. Later that day, the Australian Bureau of Meteorology upgraded it to a tropical low and labelled it 06U. 06U dissipated on 23 December.
- Tropical Low 08U formed south of Java, Indonesia on 30 December 2024. It entered the South-West Indian Ocean basin on 4 January, where it later became Cyclone Dikeledi.
- Tropical Low 10U formed on 13 January, and whilst initially forecasted by many forecast models to become a tropical cyclone, it never intensified, and was instead absorbed by the tropical low which would become Severe Tropical Cyclone Sean on 17 January near the Western Australian coast.
- Tropical Low 16U formed on 2 February, as a low pressure system in the northwest of Vanuatu, and the Joint Typhoon Warning Center (JTWC) assigned it a disturbance number of 92P. At 8 pm, the Australian Bureau of Meteorology upgraded it to a tropical depression and assigned it the number 16U. The system exited the basin on 4 February, while strengthening.
- On 6 February, a low pressure system formed along the coast of Queensland, with the Joint Typhoon Warning Center numbering it 95P. At 9 a.m. on 7 February, the Australian Bureau of Meteorology upgraded it to a tropical low and numbered it 19U. The low strengthened and exited the basin on 11 February.
- Tropical Low 20U formed on 10 February along a monsoon trough in the Gulf of Carpentaria, bringing heavy rainfalls to parts of the Cape York Peninsula before dissipating on 13 February.
- On 5 March, both the BoM and TCWC Jakarta reported that Tropical Low 23U had formed, approximately 750 kilometres (470 mi) to the northwest of the Cocos (Keeling) Islands. The disturbance later exited the basin and entered the South-West Indian Ocean basin late on 6 March, where it was named Ivone by Météo-France on 8 March.
- On 9 May, a disturbance formed near the Solomon Islands, and the Joint Typhoon Warning Center designated it 94P. At 10 a.m. on 11 May, the Australian Bureau of Meteorology upgraded it to a tropical low and designated it 34U. At 4 p.m. on 14 May, the Australian Bureau of Meteorology stopped tracking the disturbance because it had dissipated.

== Storm names ==
=== Bureau of Meteorology ===
The Australian Bureau of Meteorology (TCWC Melbourne) monitors all tropical cyclones that form within the Australian region, including any within the areas of responsibility of TCWC Jakarta or TCWC Port Moresby. Should a tropical low reach tropical cyclone strength within the BoM's area of responsibility, it will be assigned the next name from the following naming list. The names that were used for the 2024–25 season are listed below:

- Robyn
- Sean
- Taliah
- Vince
- Zelia
- Alfred
- Bianca
- Courtney
- Dianne
- Errol

Originally, the name Anthony was scheduled to be used, but was switched with Alfred from the next list of names in February 2025 to avoid confusion with Anthony Albanese, the Prime Minister of Australia at the time.

==== Retirement ====
The names Zelia and Alfred were retired during the 23rd session of the RA V Tropical Cyclone Committee and replaced with Zhu and Akio respectively.

=== TCWC Jakarta ===
TCWC Jakarta monitors Tropical Cyclones from the Equator to 10°S and from 90°E to 145°E. Should a Tropical Depression reach Tropical Cyclone strength within TCWC Jakarta's Area of Responsibility then it will be assigned the next name from the following list.

- Bakung (unused)
- Cempaka (unused)
- Dahlia (unused)
- Flamboyan (unused)
- Kenanga (unused)
- Lili (unused)

=== TCWC Port Moresby ===
Tropical cyclones that develop north of 11°S between 151°E and 160°E are assigned names by the Tropical Cyclone Warning Centre in Port Moresby, Papua New Guinea. Tropical cyclone formation in this area is extremely rare, with no cyclones being named in it since 2007, although a cyclone was assigned the name Maila in the 2025-26 Australian region cyclone season the next year. As names are assigned in a random order, the whole list is shown below:

- Alu (unused)
- Buri (unused)
- Dodo (unused)
- Emau (unused)
- Fere (unused)
- Hibu (unused)
- Ila (unused)
- Kama (unused)
- Lobu (unused)
- Maila (unused)

== Season effects ==
This table lists all of the tropical cyclones and subtropical cyclones that were monitored during the 2024–2025 Australian region cyclone season. Information on their intensity, duration, name, areas affected, primarily comes from the BoM. Death and damage reports come from either press reports or the relevant national disaster management agency while the damage totals are given in 2024 or 2025 USD.

2024–25 Australian region cyclone season
Name	Dates	Peak intensity			Areas affected	Damage (US$)	Deaths
Name	Dates	Category	Wind speed (km/h (mph))	Pressure (hPa)	Areas affected	Damage (US$)	Deaths
Robyn	18–30 Nov	Category 2 tropical cyclone	100 (65)	985	Indonesia (Greater Sunda Islands), Cocos Islands	>213,000	41
04U	7–11 Dec	Tropical low	45 (30)	1001	Indonesia (Greater Sunda Islands), Cocos Islands	Unknown	11
02U	9–12 Dec	Tropical low	55 (35)	998	None	None	0
06U	21–23 Dec	Tropical low	45 (30)	998	Queensland	None	0
07U	24–31 Dec	Tropical low	65 (40)	999	Cocos Islands	None	0
08U (Dikeledi)	30 Dec – 4 Jan	Tropical low	45 (30)	1003	None	None	0
09U	8–12 Jan	Category 1 tropical cyclone	75 (45)	1000	None	None	0
10U	13–17 Jan	Tropical low	30 (15)	1006	None	None	0
Sean	17–22 Jan	Category 4 severe tropical cyclone	175 (110)	945	Western Australia	4.65 million	0
13U	28 Jan – 1 Feb	Tropical low	55 (35)	999	Queensland	None	1
Taliah	31 Jan – 12 Feb	Category 3 severe tropical cyclone	140 (85)	964	Christmas Island, Cocos Islands	None	0
Vince	31 Jan – 4 Feb	Category 3 severe tropical cyclone	150 (90)	968	None	None	0
16U	2–4 Feb	Tropical low	Not specified	1006	None	None	0
Zelia	8–14 Feb	Category 5 severe tropical cyclone	215 (130)	927	Kimberley, Pilbara	733 million	0
19U	9–11 Feb	Tropical low	Not specified	1000	Queensland	None	0
20U	10–13 Feb	Tropical low	Not specified	1002	None	None	0
Bianca	18–27 Feb	Category 4 severe tropical cyclone	175 (110)	954	None	None	0
Alfred	21 Feb – 8 Mar	Category 4 severe tropical cyclone	165 (105)	954	Willis Island, Queensland, New South Wales	1.36 billion	1
23U (Ivone)	5–6 Mar	Tropical low	45 (30)	1005	None	None	0
25U	17–21 Mar	Category 1 tropical cyclone	75 (45)	998	Christmas Island, Cocos Islands	None	0
Courtney	22–29 Mar	Category 5 severe tropical cyclone	205 (125)	934	None	None	0
Dianne	25–29 Mar	Category 2 tropical cyclone	95 (60)	984	Kimberley	430,000	0
Errol	9–18 Apr	Category 5 severe tropical cyclone	205 (125)	936	Indonesia (Maluku), Kimberley	Minor	0
30U	16–23 Apr	Tropical low	65 (40)	998	Indonesia (Maluku), Queensland (Mapoon, Weipa), Northern Territory (Top End)	None	0
33U	9–12 May	Tropical low	65 (40)	1000	Papua New Guinea, Indonesia (South Papua)	None	0
34U	11–14 May	Tropical low	45 (30)	1003	Solomon Islands, Rennell Island	None	0
Season aggregates
26 systems	18 Nov – 14 May		215 (130)	927		>2.1 billion	54

== See also ==
- Weather of 2024 and 2025
- List of Southern Hemisphere cyclone seasons
- Tropical cyclones in 2024, 2025
- Atlantic hurricane seasons: 2024, 2025
- Pacific hurricane seasons: 2024, 2025
- Pacific typhoon seasons: 2024, 2025
- North Indian Ocean cyclone seasons: 2024, 2025
- 2024–25 South-West Indian Ocean cyclone season
- 2024–25 South Pacific cyclone season
