= List of National Trust of Fiji heritage sites =

The following is a list of heritage sites managed by the National Trust of Fiji.

== List ==
Name	Photograph	Date	Notes
Garrick Forest Reserve			
Laucala Ring-Ditch Fortification			
Levuka Historical Port Town	Beach Street, Levuka	Mid-1800s	Levuka was founded by European traders in the mid-1800s and it was the first capital of the British colony of Fiji from 1874 to 1877. The town was designated as a UNESCO World Heritage Site in June 2013.
Momi Battery Historic Park		1940	A 6-inch artillery battery which started construction in late 1940 and was built by the Fiji Defense Force and Fiji Public Works Department with help from locals in the Momi area and soldiers from New Zealand and the United States. The battery was constructed due to fears that Japan might invade Fiji.
Nakanacagi Bat Sanctuary		2019	Nakanacagi Bat Sanctuary is a sanctuary within Nakanacagi Cave in Macuata Province that is home to the endangered Fijian mastiff bat.
Sovi Basin Protected Area		2012	The Sovi Basin is a basin in Naitasiri Province. 16,344 hectares of it are currently protected for conservation.
Waisali Rainforest Reserve			A forest on Vanua Levu, the second largest island of Fiji.
Yadua Taba Crested Iguana Sanctuary		1980	A sanctuary that encompasses the entirety of the island of Yadua Taba which is home to 90% of all Fiji crested iguanas.
