= Conservation International Fiji =

Country programme of Conservation International in Fiji

- Abbreviation: CI Fiji
- Formation: 2003
- Type: Country programme
- Headquarters: Suva, Fiji
- Region served: Fiji
- Fields: Biodiversity conservation; protected areas; conservation finance
- Parent organization: Conservation International
- Website: www.conservation.org/places/fiji

Conservation International Fiji (CI Fiji) is the Fiji country programme of Conservation International. Conservation International began working in Fiji in 2003.

The programme has supported protected-area initiatives linked to the Sovi Basin Conservation Area (SBCA) on Viti Levu, including conservation-lease arrangements and management planning with landowners and partner institutions. Activities have also included conservation-finance arrangements for long-term management, blue-carbon initiatives focused on mangrove ecosystems, and conservation and livelihoods work in the Lau Islands.

== Overview ==
CI Fiji is based in Suva. The programme has used ridge-to-reef approaches that link terrestrial and freshwater ecosystems with coastal and marine environments, including a ridge-to-reef-to-ocean approach described for the Lau seascape. Fiji’s low-emission development strategy defines blue carbon as carbon stored in coastal ecosystems such as mangroves and seagrass meadows; the programme has supported development of a Blue Carbon Roadmap for Fiji and work on community perceptions of blue carbon in the Rewa Delta.

In Fiji, the programme supported the process that contributed to the establishment of the Sovi Basin Conservation Area (SBCA), including creation of a multi-stakeholder steering committee that included representatives of Fiji’s Department of Forests, the National Trust of Fiji, the University of the South Pacific, the iTaukei Land Trust Board, Conservation International and landowners, alongside development of a management plan and conservation-lease arrangements. Fiji's National Biodiversity Strategy and Action Plan described the Sovi Basin as a protected area in Namosi Province established through a conservation agreement facilitated by Conservation International, including a long-term conservation lease. Scientific fieldwork in the Sovi Basin described it as lowland tropical rainforest and noted protection arrangements involving local landowners, Conservation International and Fiji Water.

The programme has undertaken blue-carbon initiatives focused on mangrove ecosystems through the Blue Carbon Fiji Project (including baseline surveys and restoration planning in sites such as Navitilevu Bay in Ra Province), and conservation and livelihoods activities in the Lau Islands, including seagrass-related research and post-cyclone support for rebuilding food sources. Fiji’s low-emission development strategy lists Conservation International among stakeholders identified for coastal wetlands and blue carbon initiatives.

== History ==
Conservation International began working in Fiji in 2003 and established a country programme based in Suva. The programme has pursued biodiversity conservation in Fiji, including ridge-to-reef approaches that link terrestrial and freshwater ecosystems with coastal and marine environments.

During the 2000s and 2010s, CI Fiji supported the process that established the Sovi Basin Conservation Area (SBCA) in Namosi Province, including a multi-stakeholder steering committee (with representatives of Fiji’s Department of Forests, the National Trust of Fiji, the University of the South Pacific, the iTaukei Land Trust Board, Conservation International and landowners), development of a management plan and long-term conservation-lease arrangements with landowners and partner institutions. Landowners agreed in 2005 to cancel a proposed logging concession in the Sovi Basin, and reporting on protected-area legal mechanisms in Fiji described development of a conservation trust fund intended to support long-term management and provide alternative income for landowners. A feasibility study reported that a trust agreement for the Sovi Basin trust fund was signed in 2010 and that a 99-year lease was signed in 2012 between the National Trust of Fiji and the iTaukei Land Trust Board.

In the 2020s, CI Fiji’s activities included mangrove work through the Blue Carbon Fiji Project, including surveys and restoration planning in sites such as Navitilevu Bay in Ra Province. In 2025, the programme provided support for rebuilding food sources in the Lau Islands following Cyclone Rae, including distribution of planting materials beginning on Lakeba and extending to other districts.

== Programmes and operations ==
Selected programme locations in Fiji (1 Suva; 2 Sovi Basin Conservation Area; 3 Navitilevu Bay; 4 Nakauvadra Range (Ra Province); 5 Kadavu; 6 Lakeba; 7 Vanua Balavu)

=== Viti Levu ===
==== Sovi Basin Conservation Area ====
On Viti Levu, Conservation International facilitated the stakeholder process that contributed to the establishment of the Sovi Basin Conservation Area (SBCA), including governance arrangements, management planning, and conservation-lease arrangements with landowners and partner institutions. Fiji's National Biodiversity Strategy and Action Plan described the Sovi Basin as a protected area in Namosi Province covering 16,344 ha (163.44 km^{2}) and linked its establishment to a conservation agreement facilitated by Conservation International, including a long-term conservation lease.

Ecological studies describe the Sovi Basin as a lowland rainforest basin and report high tree-species diversity and endemism in plot-based vegetation surveys.

Financing arrangements described for the SBCA include a conservation trust fund.

==== Navitilevu Bay (blue carbon and mangroves) ====
Through the Blue Carbon Fiji Project, Conservation International conducted baseline studies and surveys and developed restoration plans for priority mangrove sites, including Navitilevu Bay in Ra Province. Fiji’s low-emission development strategy defines blue carbon as carbon stored in coastal ecosystems including mangroves and seagrass meadows, and lists Conservation International among stakeholders identified for coastal wetlands and blue carbon initiatives. Mangrove ecosystems have also been described as linking coastal environmental conditions and community livelihoods. A regional project factsheet also reported mangrove restoration activity in Navitilevu Bay as part of a wider ecosystem-restoration programme led by Conservation International.

==== Ra Province (forest restoration and carbon projects) ====
In Ra Province, Conservation International developed the Nakauvadra Forest Carbon Project as a community-based reforestation initiative framed around carbon sequestration, socioeconomic benefits for participating communities, and habitat restoration and buffering in the Nakauvadra area.

=== Kadavu ===
In Kadavu, Conservation International has participated as part of a multi-organisation consortium implementing the regional RESCCUE project in Fiji, including feasibility work assessing financial and economic mechanisms intended to support integrated coastal management.

=== Lau Islands ===
The programme has implemented a ridge-to-reef-to-ocean approach in the Lau seascape in partnership with the Fiji Locally Managed Marine Area network (FLMMA).

In 2025, CI provided support for rebuilding food sources in the Lau Islands following Cyclone Rae, including distribution of planting materials beginning on Lakeba and extending to other districts.

In June 2022, seagrass research and conservation efforts were reported as continuing in the Lau Group in connection with Conservation International's work.

A cave on Vanua Balavu has been described as having thousands of Pacific sheath-tailed bats. A 2023 survey announcement described the colony as the largest known Pacific bat roost and linked the finding to documenting species distribution and informing conservation actions.

Selected landscapes and locations related to Conservation International Fiji programme themes
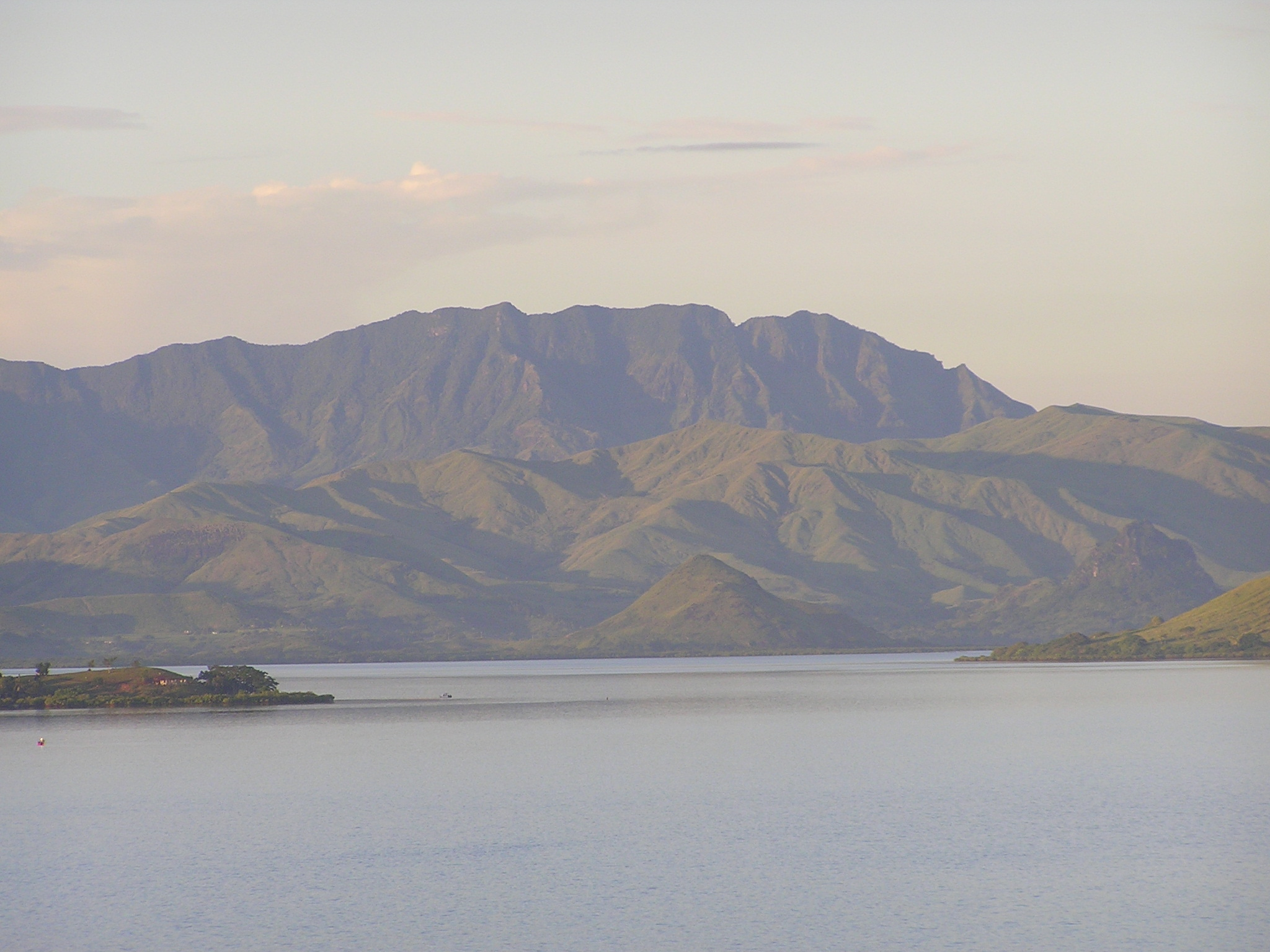
Mountains near Rakiraki, Ra Province

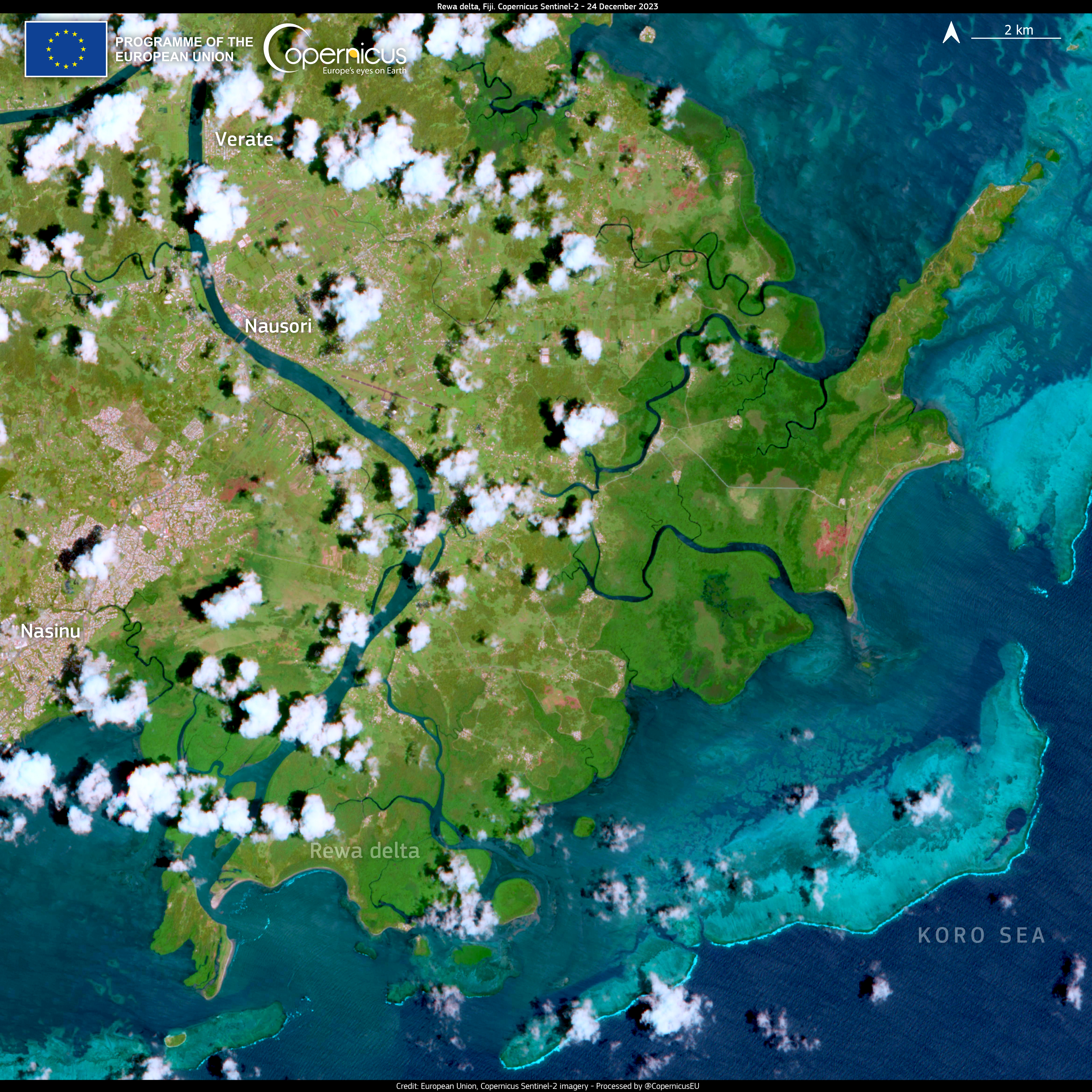
Satellite view of the Rewa Delta, a mangrove landscape in Viti Levu

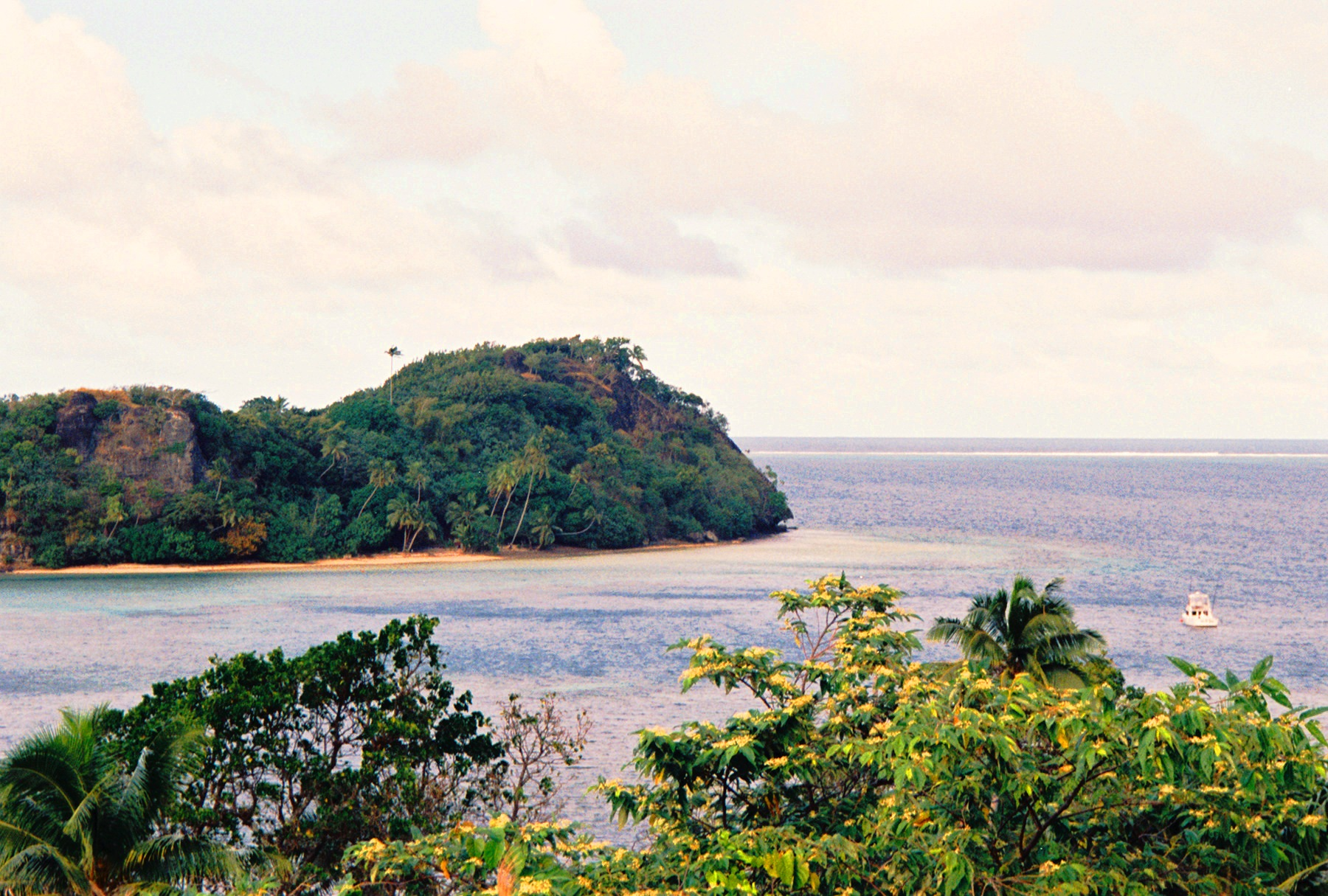
Kadavu Island and the Great Astrolabe Reef

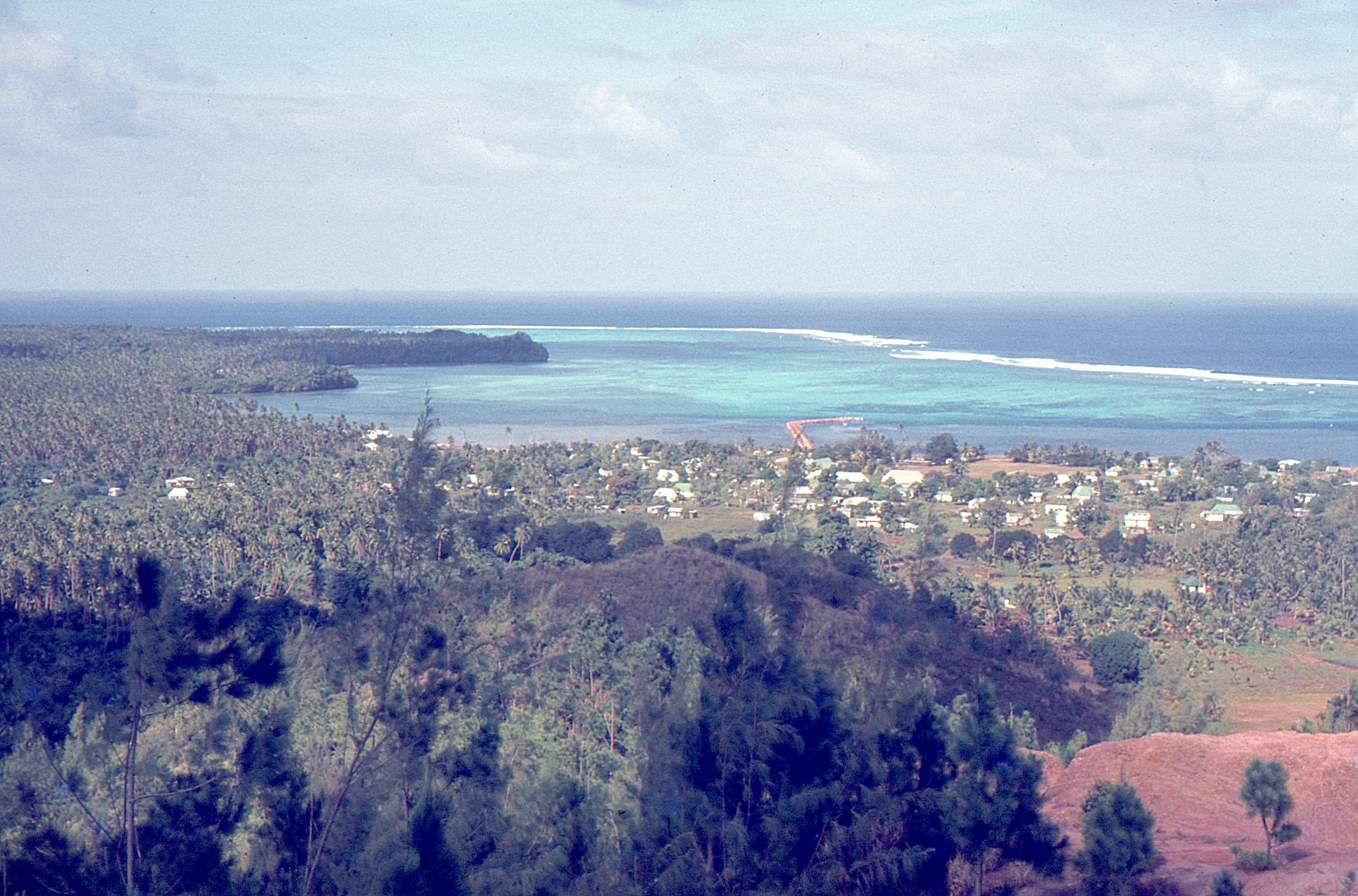
Tubou, the main village on Lakeba, in the Lau Islands

== Partnerships ==
The programme’s work linked to the Sovi Basin Conservation Area has involved local landowners and Fiji government-linked institutions, including a steering committee with representatives of Fiji’s Department of Forests, the National Trust of Fiji, the University of the South Pacific, the iTaukei Land Trust Board, Conservation International and landowners. Fiji’s national biodiversity strategy describes the conservation agreement as facilitated through collaboration between the Fiji Government and local landowners and notes that the protected area is managed by the National Trust of Fiji. Scientific fieldwork on the Sovi Basin has also described protection arrangements involving local landowners, Conservation International and Fiji Water.

Blue-carbon initiatives have involved work with coastal communities through the Blue Carbon Fiji Project. Reporting on baseline surveys described collaboration with WWF and the Ministry of Forestry and reported household surveys covering 28 villages and more than 600 households across project areas in Rewa, Tailevu, Ba and Ra Province. A project factsheet for the regional RESTORE programme listed CI Fiji as the Fiji partner and described the Navitilevu Bay blue-carbon pilot as co-financed through the Fiji Blue Carbon Project and nearing final design for Plan Vivo certification.

In Kadavu, the programme has worked as part of the RESCCUE project consortium in Fiji; the feasibility study for integrated coastal management in Kadavu lists consortium partners including the Institute of Applied Sciences at the University of the South Pacific, Landcare Research, Wildlife Conservation Society and Conservation International.

In the Lau seascape, the programme has worked in partnership with the Fiji Locally Managed Marine Area network (FLMMA) on ridge-to-reef-to-ocean approaches.

== Funding and conservation finance ==
In the SBCA, a conservation trust fund has supported long-term protected-area management and finance linked to the conservation lease, including land-rental payments, offsets for foregone timber royalties, and contributions to a Community Conservation and Development Fund that has supported scholarships and other community projects. The iTaukei Land Trust Board brokered the conservation lease, with technical support from the University of the South Pacific and Conservation International.

The trust fund is overseen by a small donor board and managed by an offshore financial service provider, with budget decision-making and funds disbursement handled by a national parastatal with input from community representatives.

Annual costs reported for the SBCA lease arrangements and landowner compensation totalled about US$62,000, while annual management costs were estimated at about US$65,000. The endowment was capitalised with initial contributions of US$1.5 million from Conservation International’s Global Conservation Fund and US$2.25 million from the Fiji Water Foundation, with the trust fund held in Singapore. Investment income from the endowment has been reported as sufficient to cover annual management and compensation costs. A feasibility study reported a target capitalisation of US$4.25 million and an initial endowment of US$3.627 million under a trust agreement signed in 2010, with planned GEF-4 contributions of US$0.25 million annually over three years for management costs; it also described the trust fund as financing iTaukei land royalty and lease payments, a community fund and the management budget of the National Trust of Fiji.

Fiji’s low-emission development strategy defines blue carbon as carbon stored in coastal ecosystems such as mangroves and seagrass meadows. A regional ecosystem-restoration programme led by Conservation International reported €3.3 million in Kiwa Initiative funding and €947,800 in co-funding, and described mangrove restoration in Navitilevu Bay as co-financed through the Fiji Blue Carbon Project and designed for Plan Vivo certification.

A restoration and erosion-control action plan for Ra Province described the Nakauvadra Forest Carbon Project as funded by the Fiji Water Foundation.

In 2025, CI provided FJ$80,000 in support to help rebuild sustainable food sources in the Lau Islands following Cyclone Rae.

== Impact and evaluation ==
Sources describing the Sovi Basin Conservation Area report that the conservation agreement and long-term conservation lease established a 16,344 ha protected area in Namosi Province, managed by the National Trust of Fiji and supported by a conservation trust fund intended to finance protected-area management and lease-linked community benefits. A case-study account of the SBCA reported that scholarship support for landowning communities had reached more than 150 students by 2012. For mangrove work, reporting on baseline surveys for the Blue Carbon Fiji Project described household surveys covering 28 villages and more than 600 households and ground-truthing work to identify restoration priorities in sites including Navitilevu Bay.

Evaluation-style reporting on the SBCA includes a final project completion report for an economic valuation study that documented data-gathering and consultations with national environment and protected-area bodies and reported that the consultations contributed to a government decision to suspend a decision on a proposed lease pending further analysis; the report also noted delays in engaging a consultant and that the work was not completed within the original grant period. A 2025 project factsheet for the regional RESTORE programme listed implementation outputs to date in Fiji including 10 hectares of mangroves restored and 6,000 mangrove planter bags produced at Navitilevu Bay, identification of coral-restoration sites and delivery of 1,800 reef stars for marine restoration in Lau Province, and beekeeping training and beehive distribution in Kadavu.

== Reception ==
In 2011, a class-action lawsuit challenged Fiji Water’s "carbon negative" marketing claims. The coverage described the company as presenting its offset strategy as including a partnership with Conservation International and an "extensive forest restoration project" in Fiji.
