= 2024–25 Southern Hemisphere tropical cyclone season =

The 2024–25 Southern Hemisphere tropical cyclone season consists of three different tropical cyclone seasons south of the equator:

- 2024–25 South-West Indian Ocean cyclone season, west of 90°E
- 2024–25 Australian region cyclone season, from 90°E to 160°E
- 2024–25 South Pacific cyclone season, east of 160°E
