= Sigatoka Sand Dunes =

Sigatoka Sand Dunes National Park
- IUCN category II (national park)
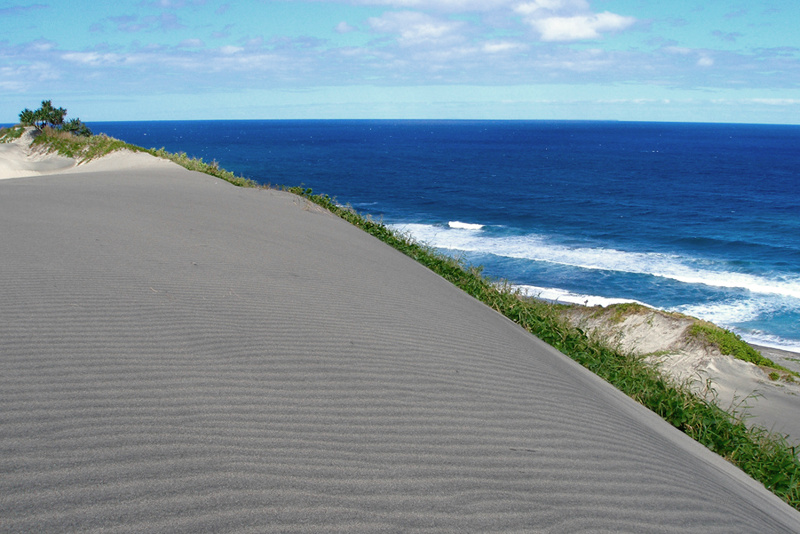
- Sigatoka Sand Dunes
- Interactive map of Sigatoka Sand Dunes National Park
- Location: Viti Levu, Fiji
- Nearest town: Sigatoka
- Coordinates: 18°9′59.76″S 177°29′20.04″E
- Area: 1.77 km^{2} (0.68 sq mi)
- Established: 1988
- Governing body: National Trust of Fiji

The Sigatoka Sand Dunes are located directly west of the mouth of the Sigatoka River, about 3 kilometres (1.9 mi) west of the town of Sigatoka on the island of Viti Levu in Fiji. The dune system extends over an area of 650 hectares (1,600 acres), with almost half being within Sigatoka Sand Dunes National Park.

== Description ==
The parabolic dunes extend about 3 kilometres (1.9 mi) along the coast at heights ranging from 65.6 to 196.85 feet (19.99 to 60.00 m), the latter at the western end.

The dunes are thousands of years old, the product of erosion in the coastal hinterland and coastal dune forming processes. They are composed of "a fine greyish brown colored sediment that differs from the traditional fine sandy tan dunes in most places." About half are unstable, particularly in the eastern part.

== Flora and fauna ==
The vegetation is mostly native, but includes introduced species. Unique local tree species have adapted to the shifting sands. The dry forest includes sikeci (Aleurites moluccanus), dilo (Calophyllum inophyllum), dakua (Agathis macrophylla), Pandanus and mahogany trees. Vines and grasses help stabilize the dunes.

The park is home to 37 bird species, including the many-coloured fruit dove. Eight species are endemic to Fiji, among them the Fiji bush warbler, Fiji goshawk and Fiji white-eye.

There are also:

- skinks
- lizards
- geckos
- fruit bats
- Fijian swallowtail butterfly (endemic)
- Pacific boa

== National Park ==
The dunes were designated Fiji's first national park in July 1989 and consequently came under the management of the National Trust of Fiji. It occupies an area of only 1.77 square kilometres (0.68 sq mi).

== Archaeological site ==
Archaeological excavations have uncovered pottery more than 2,600 years old, as well as one of the largest burial sites in the Pacific, containing over 50 bodies and believed to be from the Late Lapita period. Pottery shards, stone tools, human remains and other archaeological relics continue to be uncovered by natural processes.

== World Heritage status ==
This site was added to the UNESCO World Heritage Tentative List on 26 October 1999 in the Cultural category.
