= National Trust of Fiji =

The National Trust of Fiji is a statutory organization in Fiji devoted to conservation of public resources. The trust was created in 1970 by the National Trust for Fiji Act.

It administers parks and various historical sites. The parks are Sigatoka Sandunes National Park, Sovi Basin, JH Garrick Memorial Park, Waisali Forest Reserve, Momi Battery Historic Park, and Yaduataba Crested Iguana Sanctuary.

The National Trust's primary purposes are preservation of historic and natural resources; promotion and augmentation of the amenities to those resources; conservation of flora and fauna; and provision of access to the historic and natural resources for the public.

In 2000, the National Trust of Fiji campaigned for awareness about the diminishing number of indigenous birds, such as the kaka and kula.

== See also ==
- List of National Trust of Fiji heritage sites
