= Cyclone Rae =

South Pacific cyclone in 2025

Tropical Cyclone Rae
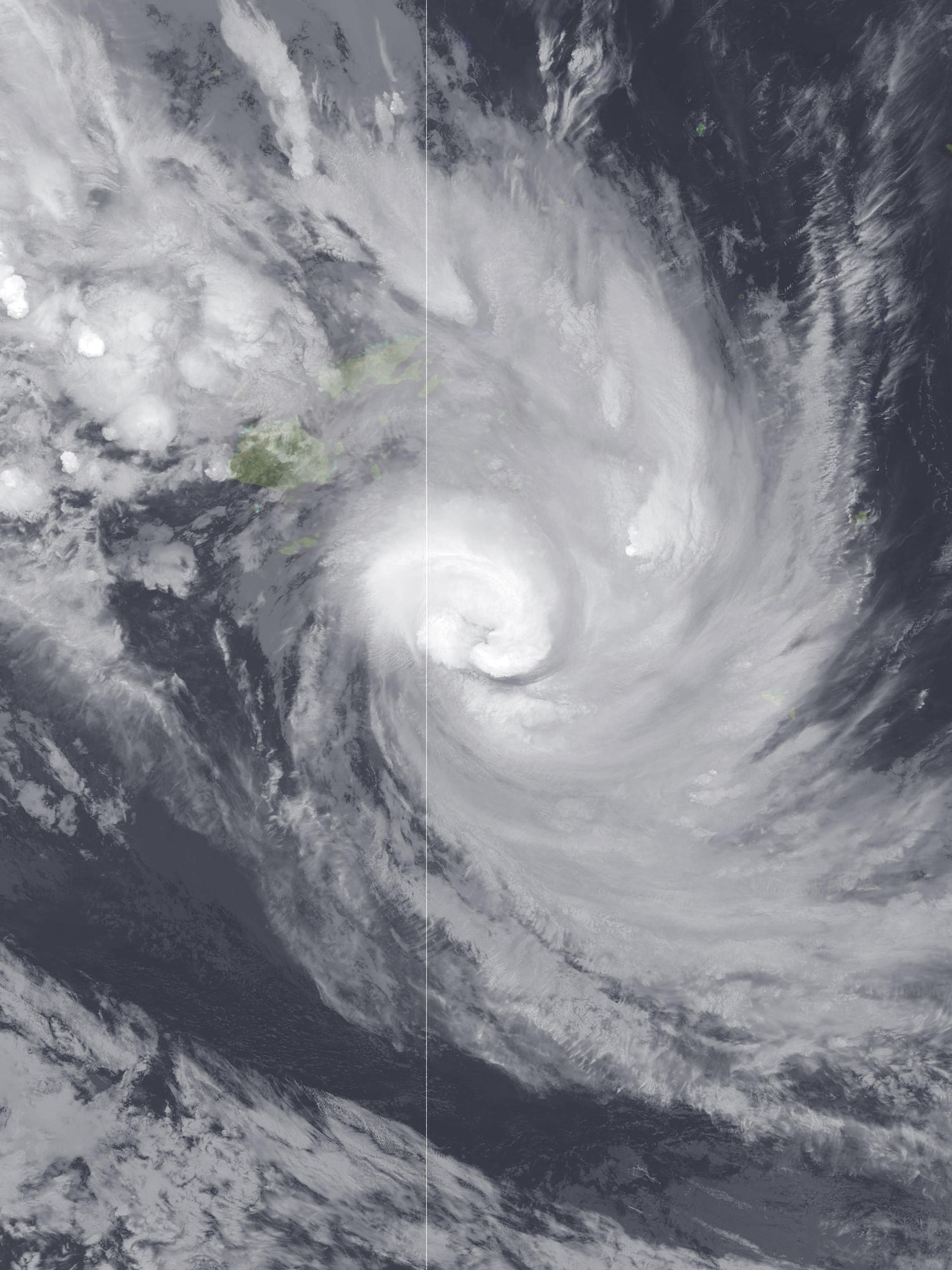
- Cyclone Rae moving south of Fiji on 24 February

Meteorological history
- Formed: 21 February 2025
- Dissipated: 2 March 2025

Category 2 tropical cyclone
- 10-minute sustained (FMS)
- Highest winds: 110 km/h (70 mph)
- Lowest pressure: 975 hPa (mbar); 28.79 inHg

Category 3-equivalent tropical cyclone
- 1-minute sustained (SSHWS/JTWC)
- Highest winds: 185 km/h (115 mph)
- Lowest pressure: 958 hPa (mbar); 28.29 inHg

Overall effects
- Fatalities: None
- Damage: Unknown
- Areas affected: Fiji; Wallis and Futuna; Tonga
- IBTrACS
- Part of the 2024–25 South Pacific cyclone season

Tropical Cyclone Rae was a moderately strong tropical cyclone that impacted Fiji in February 2025. The second named storm of the 2024–25 South Pacific cyclone season, Rae originated from a low-pressure area that developed north of Fiji on 20 February. The disturbance moved east-southeast slowly over the next several days, organizing under favourable environmental conditions. It was designated as a tropical depression on 22 February as it turned southward. The system attained Category 1 strength on the next day and was assigned the name Rae. It then passed over the Lau Islands on 24 February, after which it attained a peak intensity as a high-end Category 2 cyclone. Shortly thereafter, unfavorable conditions caused Rae to steadily weaken, as it began its transition into a extratropical cyclone and dissipate on 26 February.

== Meteorological history ==
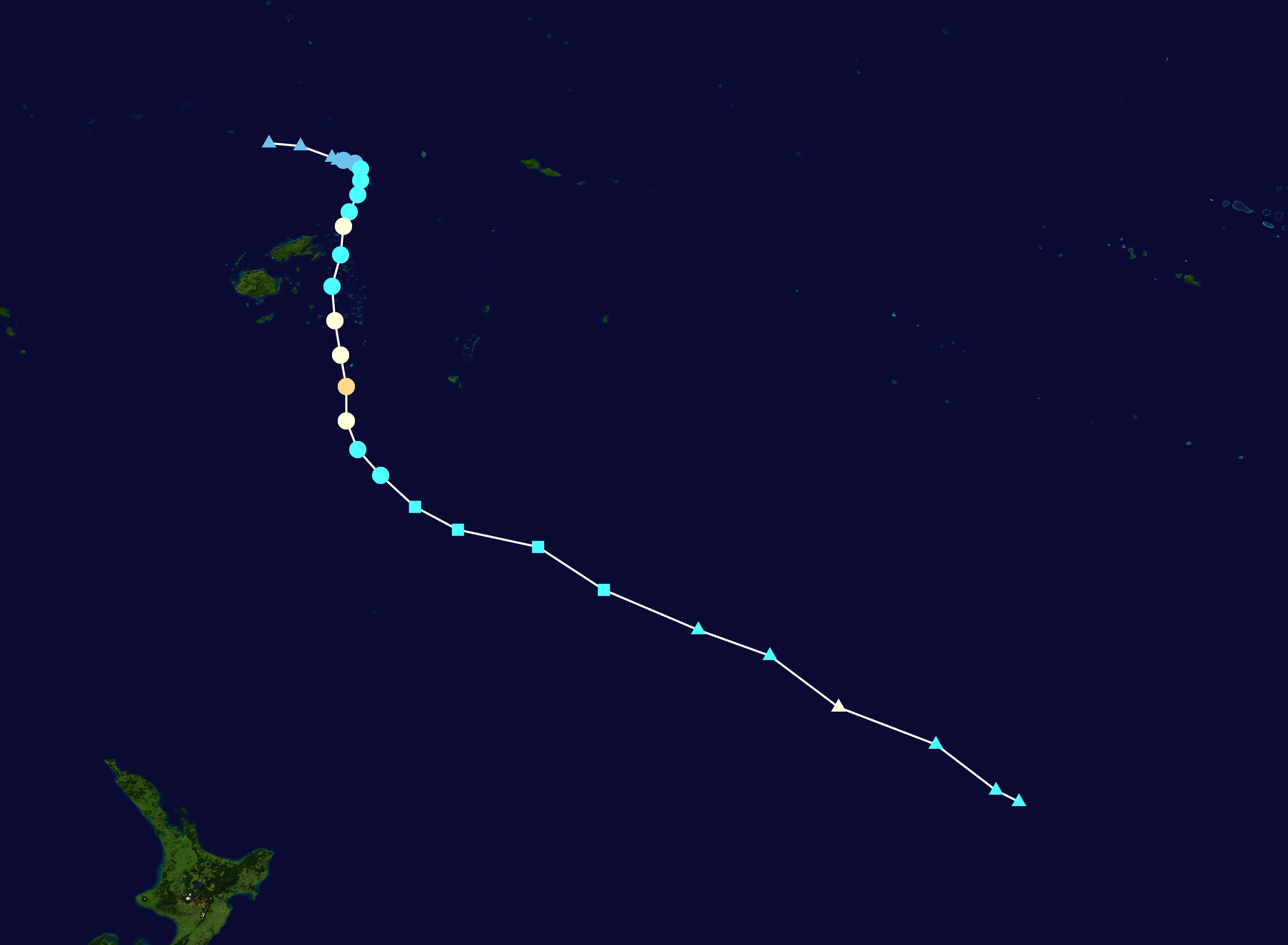
Map plotting the storm's track and intensity, according to the Saffir–Simpson scale Map key Saffir–Simpson scale Tropical depression (≤38 mph, ≤62 km/h) Tropical storm (39–73 mph, 63–118 km/h) Category 1 (74–95 mph, 119–153 km/h) Category 2 (96–110 mph, 154–177 km/h) Category 3 (111–129 mph, 178–208 km/h) Category 4 (130–156 mph, 209–251 km/h) Category 5 (≥157 mph, ≥252 km/h) Unknown Storm type Tropical cyclone Subtropical cyclone Extratropical cyclone, remnant low, tropical disturbance, or monsoon depression

On 20 February, the Fiji Meteorological Service (FMS) noted a low-pressure area formed north of Fiji. The system moved slowly to east-southeast and gradually organized. On 22 February, the FMS classified it as a tropical depression and designated as 09F about 350 km (220 mi) northeast of Cikobia-i-Ra. The system gradually strengthened as benefited from sea surface temperature of 29 °C (84 °F), low wind shear and good upper divergence. It turned southward as steered by a near-equatorial ridge. Deep convection began to wrap inside the center, and the FMS upgraded the disturbance to a Category 1 tropical cyclone at 06:00 UTC on 23 February, and assigned the name Rae to the system. Rae formed alongside Cyclone Alfred and Tropical Depression 10F, which will later develop into Cyclone Seru. Environmental conditions favoured additional strengthening, and Rae attained Category 2 status just six hours later. Rae continued to move southward and passed just east of Vanua Levu later that day. Rae passed over the Lau Islands early on 24 February. Despite deep convection developed and wrapping into the center, the center became elongated. Nonetheless, Rae still attained peak intensity with sustained winds of 110 km/h (70 mph) and a minumum pressure of 975 hPa (28.8 inHg), just shy of severe tropical cyclone status. At that time, an eye-like feature displayed on satellite imagery. Shortly afterwards, wind shear increased and the center became partly exposed. Sea surface temperature also dropped to 26–27 °C (79–81 °F), resulted in steadily weakening. Rae dropped to Category 1 strength at 12:00 UTC on 26 February, and the cyclone began to curve south-southeast as situated at the western edge of a subtropical ridge. On 26 February, Rae transitioned into an extratropical low after passing Lau Islands near Fiji. The post-tropical cyclone drifted south east and eventually dissipated in the South Pacific Ocean.

Tropical Cyclone Report for Rae from RSMC Nadi in February 2025.

== Preparations and impact ==
As Rae was forecasted to become a severe tropical cyclone, Moala Islands was placed under a hurricane warning, while the eastern part of Vanua Levu was placed under a gale warning. A heavy rain warning was issued for the entire Fiji. Schools in the Lau Islands, Lomaiviti Islands, and Vanua Levu were closed on February 24. Domestic flights of Fiji Link were cancelled. The warnings were lifted as Rae moved away from the country. In Tonga, a tropical cyclone warning was placed under Niuafoʻou and Niuatoputapu, while a tropical cyclone watch was placed under Vavaʻu and Haʻapai. A heavy rain warning and flash flood advisory was issued for the entire Tonga.

Passing just east of Vanua Levu, Rae brought heavy rains to the island and triggered flooding. Crops and farm were damaged by strong winds and floodwaters. The authority was still investigating the damage on the island. In Sawana, a lot of trees were uprooted by strong winds and blocked roads on Vanua Balavu. Farms were destroyed and the village was suffered from food and water shortage. Five families were sheltered in a school. The damage in the village was the most serious since Winston in 2016.

== See also ==
- Tropical cyclones in 2025
- Weather of 2025
- Cyclone Tomas (2010)
- Cyclone Yasa (2020)
- Cyclone Ana (2021)
