= Yadua Tabu =

Islet in Vanua Levu Group, Fiji

Yadua Taba Iguana Sanctuary Kequ Taba Iguana Sanctuary(Fijian) केकू तबा इगुआना अभयारण्य (Fiji Hindi)
- IUCN category IV (habitat/species management area)
- Location within Fiji
- Location: Vanua Levu Group, Fiji
- Coordinates: 16°50′00″S 178°16′45″E
- Area: 0.71 km^{2} (0.27 sq mi)
- Max. elevation: 100 metres (330 ft)
- Established: 1981
- Governing body: National Trust of Fiji

Yadua Taba (pronounced [janˈdua ˈtamba]) is a volcanic islet in Fiji, an outlier to the northern island of Vanua Levu, and immediately south of the larger island Yadua. Yadua Taba covers an area of 0.7 square kilometres and has a maximum elevation of 100 meters. Yadua Taba is a protected sanctuary for the Fiji crested iguana (Brachylophus vitiensis) and also contains a strand of dry littoral forestry, almost completely lost in the rest of Fiji. Landing here is strictly prohibited.

In 1979, the government of Fiji placed the island under national protection when the iguana population was discovered. The sanctuary is of national significance as outlined in Fiji's Biodiversity Strategy and Action Plan.

== World Heritage Status ==
This site was added to the UNESCO World Heritage Tentative List (in the Natural category) on October 26, 1999.

== See also ==
- Desert island
- List of islands
