= 2024–25 South Pacific cyclone season =

Cyclone season in the South Pacific Ocean

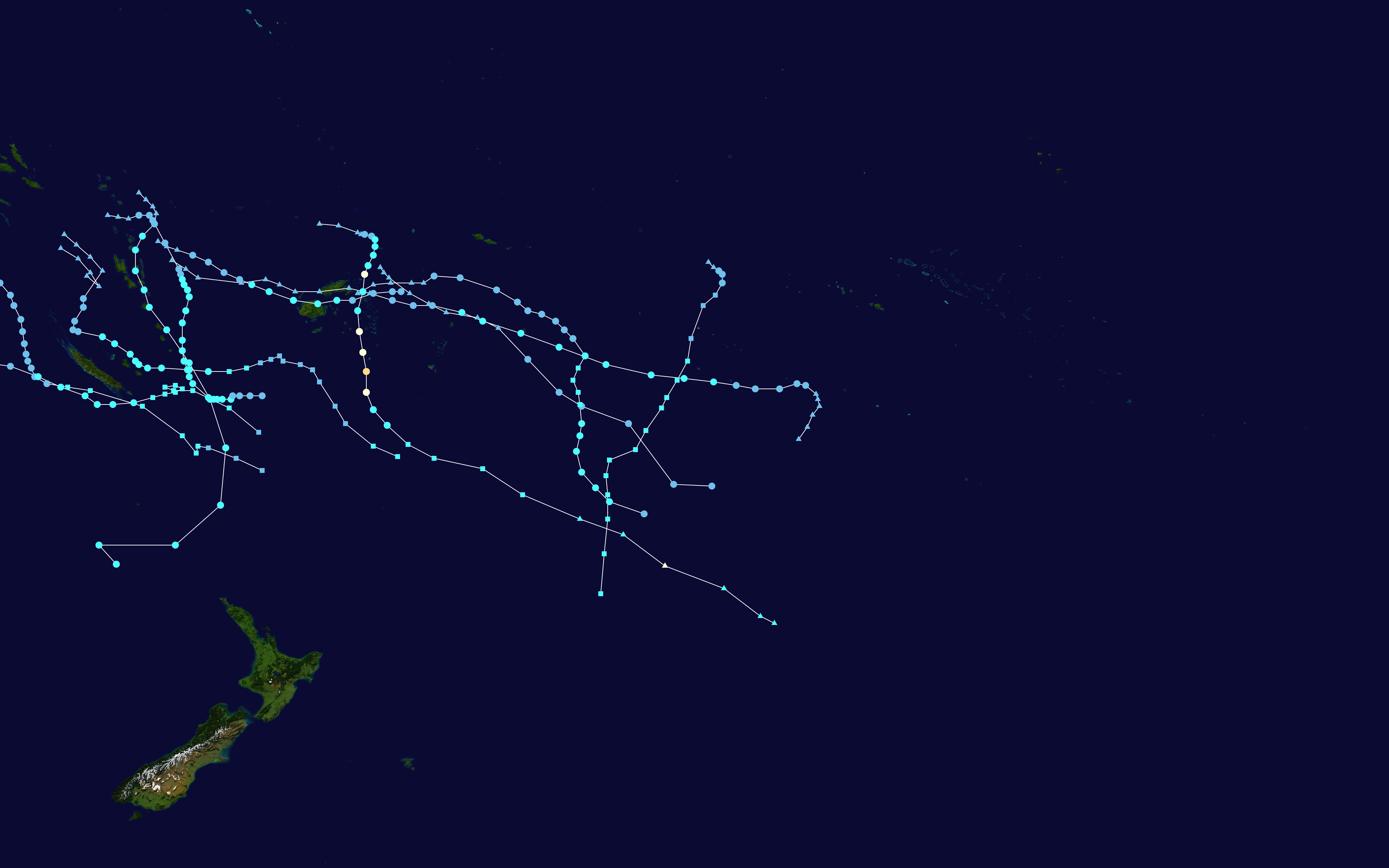
- Season summary map

Seasonal boundaries
- First system formed: 28 December 2024
- Last system dissipated: 16 April 2025

Strongest storm
- Name: Rae
  - Maximum winds: 110 km/h (70 mph) (10-minute sustained)
  - Lowest pressure: 975 hPa (mbar)

Seasonal statistics
- Total disturbances: 11
- Total depressions: 8
- Tropical cyclones: 4
- Severe tropical cyclones: 0 (record low, tied with 2008–09)
- Total fatalities: 0 (6)
- Total damage: Unknown

Related articles
- 2024–25 Australian region cyclone season; 2024–25 South-West Indian Ocean cyclone season

The 2024–25 South Pacific cyclone season was a very inactive South Pacific cyclone season, seeing four named storms forming, none of which intensified into severe tropical cyclones, the first such occurrence since the 2008–09 season. The season officially started on 1 November 2024, and ended on 30 April 2025; however a tropical cyclone could form at any time between 1 July 2024, and 30 June 2025, and would count towards the season total. During the season, tropical cyclones will be officially monitored by the Fiji Meteorological Service, Australian Bureau of Meteorology and New Zealand's MetService.

The United States Armed Forces through the Joint Typhoon Warning Center (JTWC) will also monitor the basin and issue unofficial warnings for American interests. The FMS attaches a number and an F suffix to tropical disturbances that form in or move into the basin while the JTWC designates significant tropical cyclones with a number and a P suffix. The BoM, FMS and MetService all use the Australian Tropical Cyclone Intensity Scale and estimate windspeeds with a period of approximately ten minutes, while the JTWC estimates sustained winds over a 1-minute period, which are subsequently compared to the Saffir–Simpson hurricane wind scale (SSHWS).

== Seasonal forecasts ==
Source/Record	Region	Tropical Cyclone	Severe Tropical Cyclones	Ref
Records
Average (1969–70 – 2023–24):	160°E – 120°W	7	3	
Record high:	160°E – 120°W	1997–98: 16	1982–83: 9	
Record low:	160°E – 120°W	1990–91: 2	2008–09: 0	
Predictions
NIWA October	135°E – 120°W	9–14	4–8	
FMS Whole	160°E – 120°W	5–6	1–2	
FMS Western	160°E – 180°	2–5	1–2	
FMS Eastern	180° – 120°W	1–2	0–1	

Ahead of the season officially starting on 1 November, the Fiji Meteorological Service (FMS) and New Zealand's National Institute of Water and Atmospheric Research (NIWA), both issued a tropical cyclone outlook that discussed the upcoming season. These outlooks took into account a variety of factors such as a developing weak to moderate La Niña event and what had happened in previous seasons such as 1983–84, 1995–96, 2000–01, 2005–06, 2008–09, 2016–17 and 2017–18.

The Southwest Pacific tropical cyclone outlook issued by New Zealand's National Institute of Water and Atmospheric Research (NIWA) in conjunction with MetService and various other Pacific meteorological services, predicted that six to ten tropical cyclones would occur over the South Pacific Ocean between 135°E and 120°W. The outlook also predicted that three to four of these tropical cyclones would intensify further and become either a Category three, four or five severe tropical cyclone on the Australian tropical cyclone intensity scale.

In addition to contributing towards the Southwest Pacific tropical cyclone outlook, the FMS predicted that between five and six tropical cyclones would occur within the basin. One or two of these tropical cyclones were expected to intensify further and become either a category three, four or five severe tropical cyclone on the Australian scale.

Both outlooks predicted that the majority of systems would occur to the west of the International Dateline, which as a result meant that the Solomon Islands had a normal to elevated risk of being impacted by a tropical cyclone. It was predicted that Vanuatu and New Caledonia had a normal chance of being impacted by a tropical cyclone while Fiji, Niue, Samoa, American Samoa, Tokelau, Tonga, Tuvalu, Wallis and Futuna had a normal to reduced chance of being impacted by a tropical cyclone.

== Seasonal summary ==
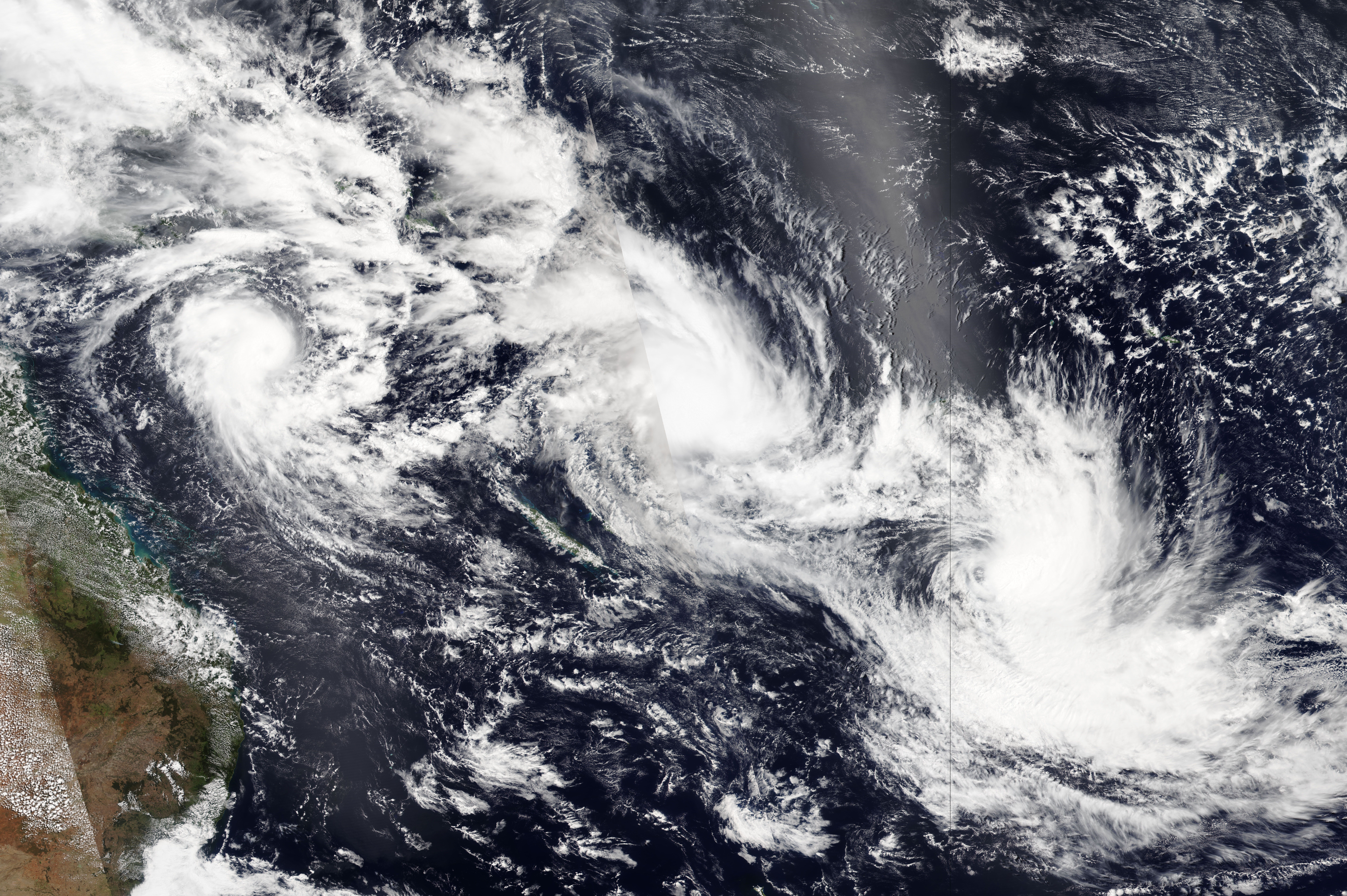
Three systems active on 25 February: Cyclone Alfred (left), Cyclone Seru (centre), and Cyclone Rae (right).

The season began abnormally late, the first system of the season, Tropical Depression 01F formed in late December. The storm eventually made landfall in Fiji and dissipated during the last few days of the year. Tropical Disturbances 02F and 03F were designated on 31 December and 5 January respectively, both stayed out to sea moving southeastwards before both dissipating 3 days later. The first named storm of the season, Tropical Cyclone Pita formed on 9 January. The storm dropped heavy rains that resulted in flooding across Samoa and Fiji, isolated flooding occurred in the latter nation including the collapse of a bridge.

After a long pause in activity, two Tropical Depressions (05F and 07F) were monitored in early and mid-February. 06F however failed to reach Tropical Depression status. Tropical Depression 08F were monitored later that month. On 22 February Tropical Cyclone Rae developed passing just east of Fiji. On 23 February, the Fiji Meteorological Service named Tropical Cyclone Rae. Rae peaked on 25 February with winds of 110km/h and 975 hpa. A few days later on 24 February, Tropical Cyclone Seru formed. Seru peaked with 110km/h and 980 hpa on 25 February. Rae turned post-tropical on 26 February and Seru degenerated into a remnant low on 1 March, respectively. After a second, even more significant lull in activity, Tropical Cyclone Tam was named on 14 April by the Fiji Meteorological Service. It intensified into a deep subtropical cyclone by 16 April, bringing severe weather to northern New Zealand and causing 5 deaths in New South Wales in Australia.

== Systems ==
=== Tropical Depression 01F ===
- Tropical depression (Australian scale)
- Tropical storm (SSHWS)
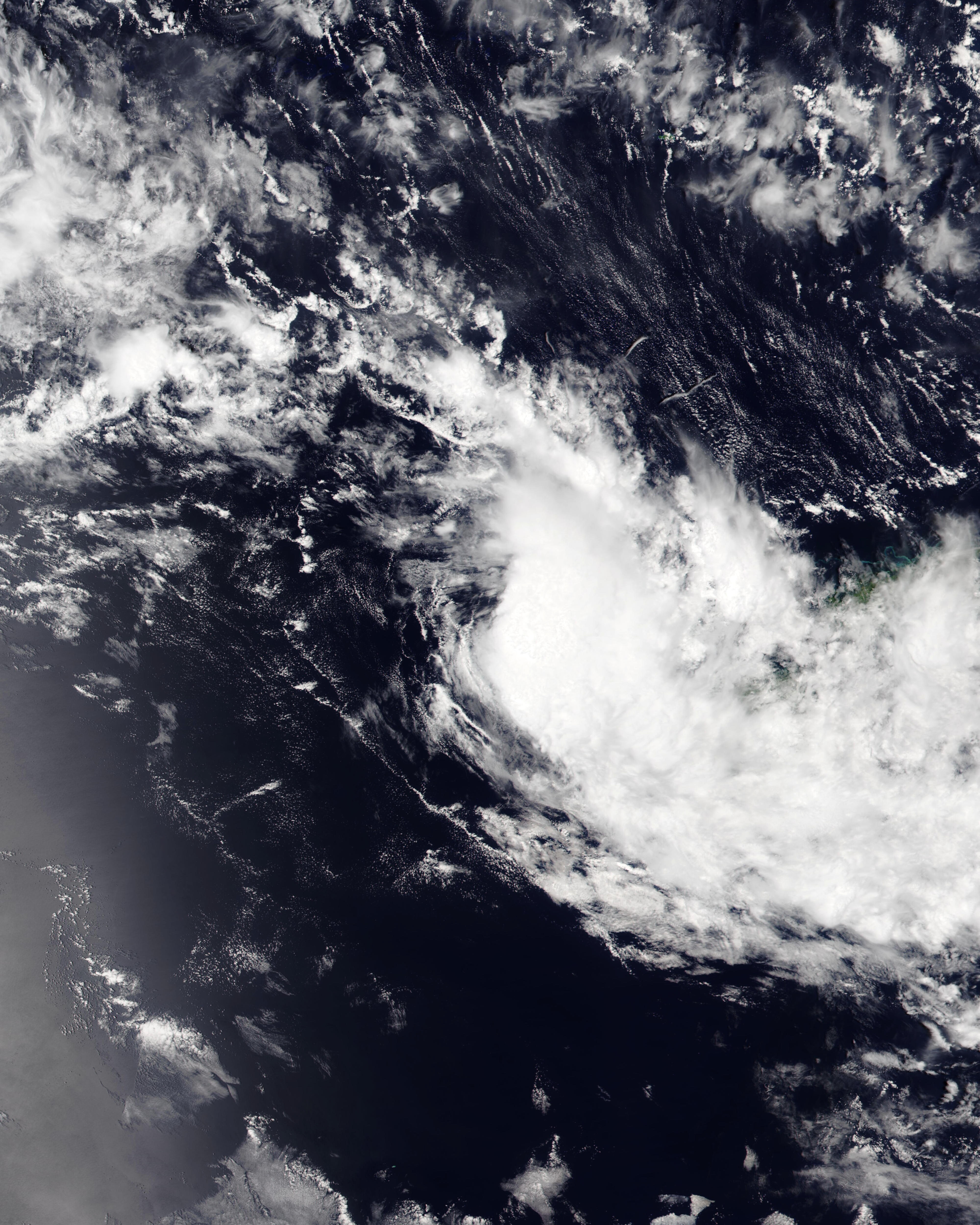
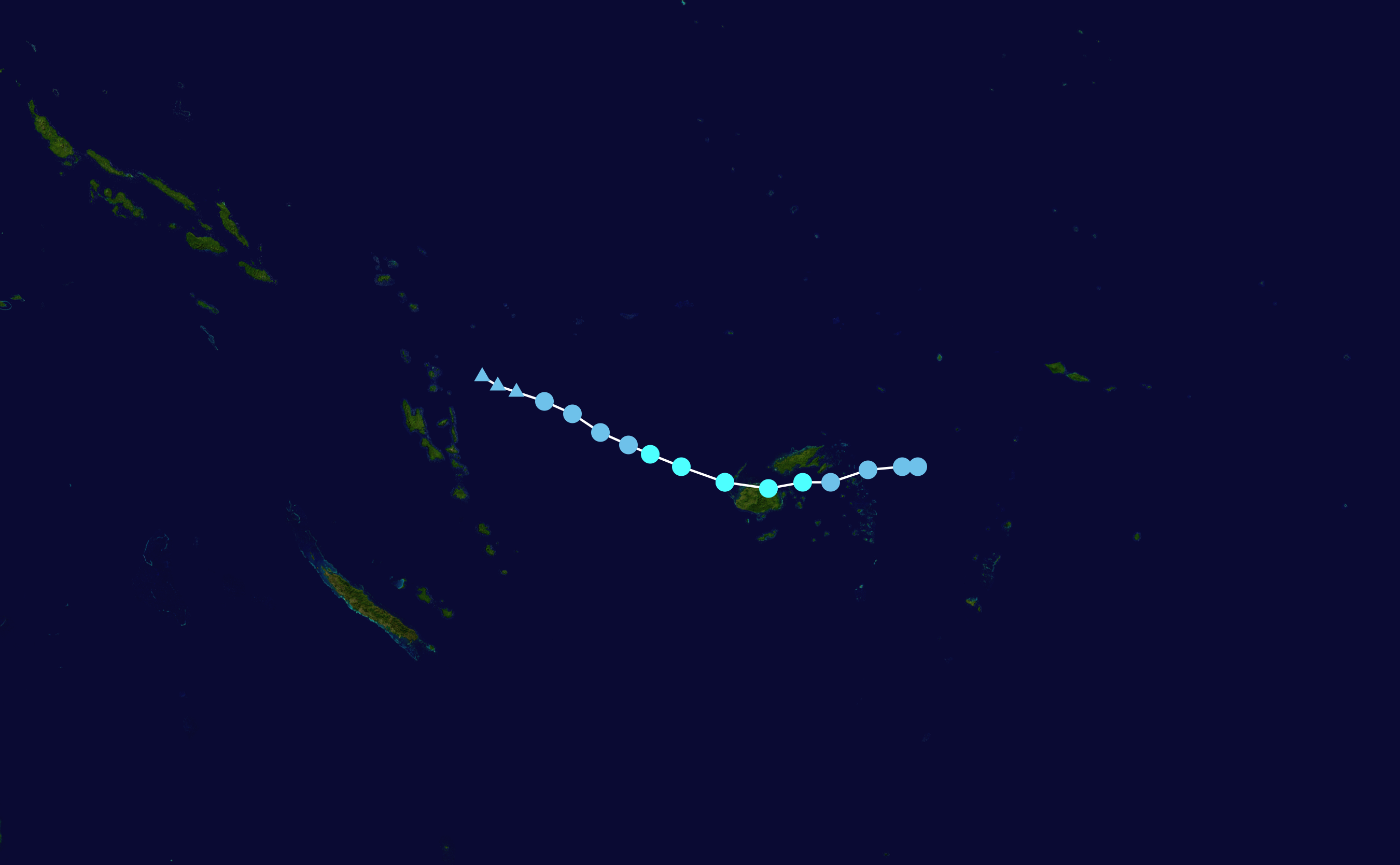
- Duration: 28 December – 30 December
- Peak intensity: 75 km/h (45 mph) (1-min); 1004 hPa (mbar)

On 28 December, A disturbance Formed near Fiji, designated as Tropical Disturbance 01F by the FMS. Soon. 01F strengthened, and then the FMS upgraded it into a tropical depression. It then went over Fiji with tropical storm-force winds. Soon on 30 December, it dissipated. It's max winds were 60mph. It didn't cause damage, and no deaths were reported.

=== Tropical Disturbance 02F ===
- Tropical disturbance (Australian scale)
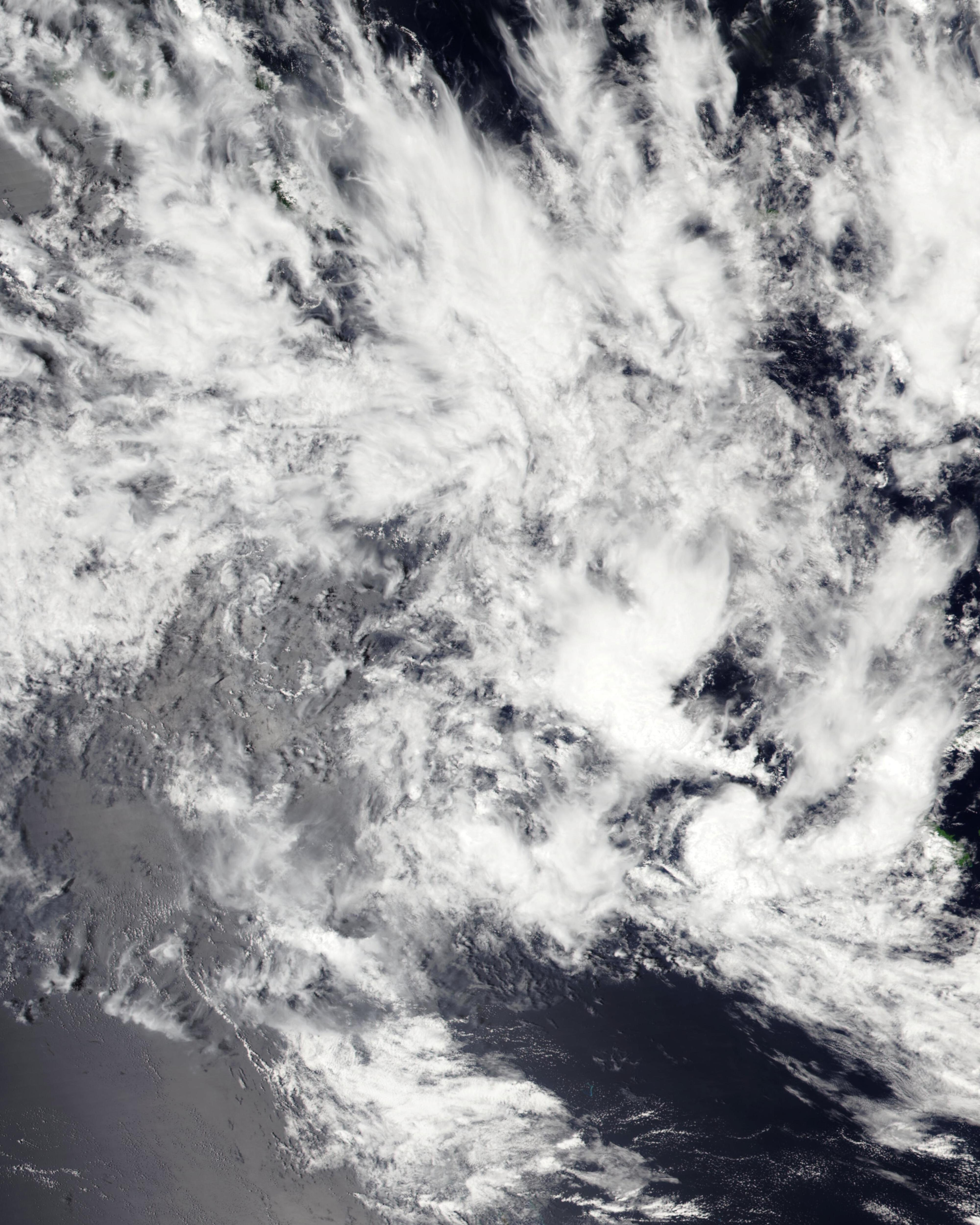
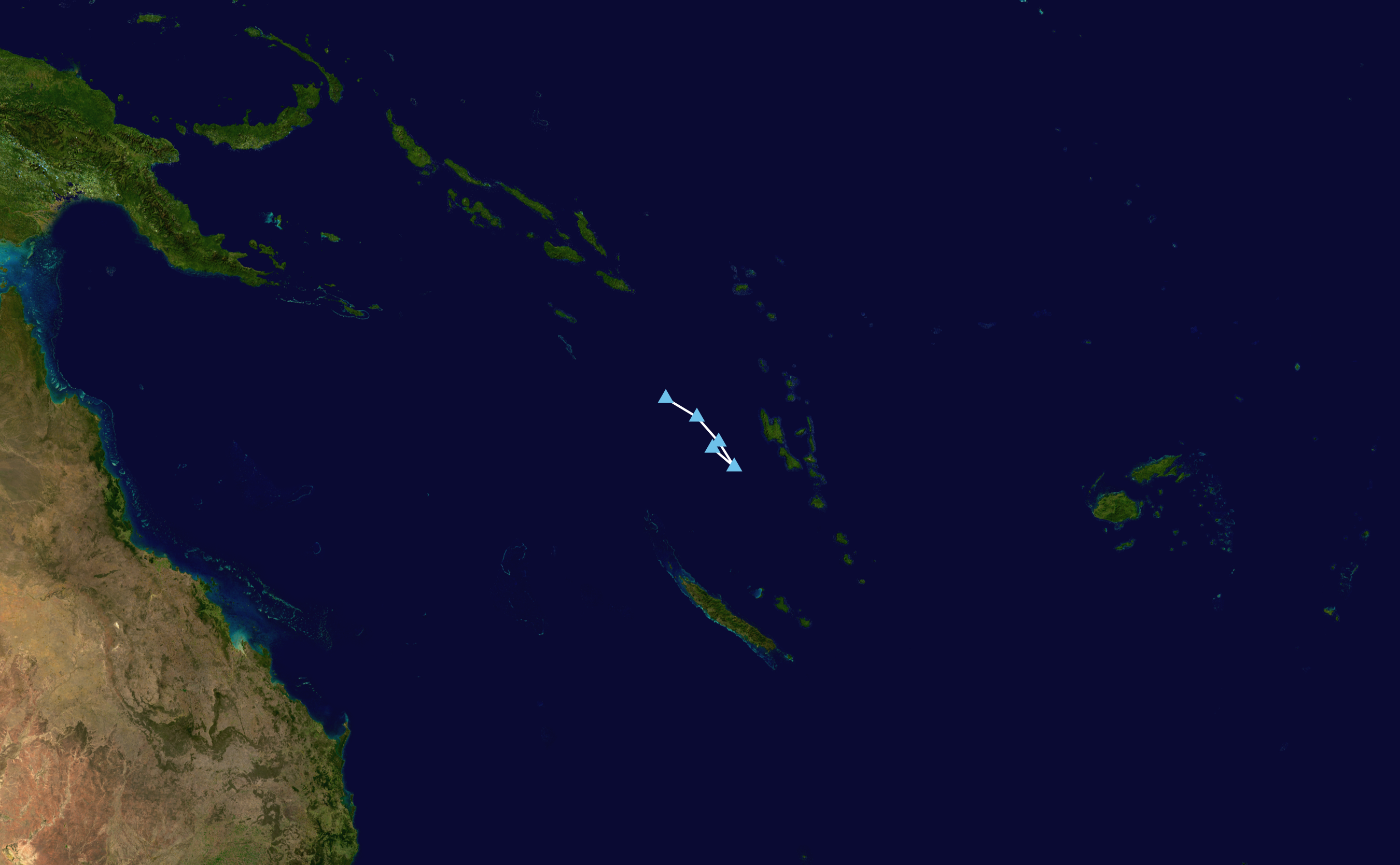
- Duration: 31 December – 2 January
- Peak intensity: Winds not specified; 1006 hPa (mbar)

On 31 December, a low-pressure area formed on the sea northeastern of Australia. It became a tropical disturbance on the same day.

=== Tropical Disturbance 03F ===
- Tropical disturbance (Australian scale)
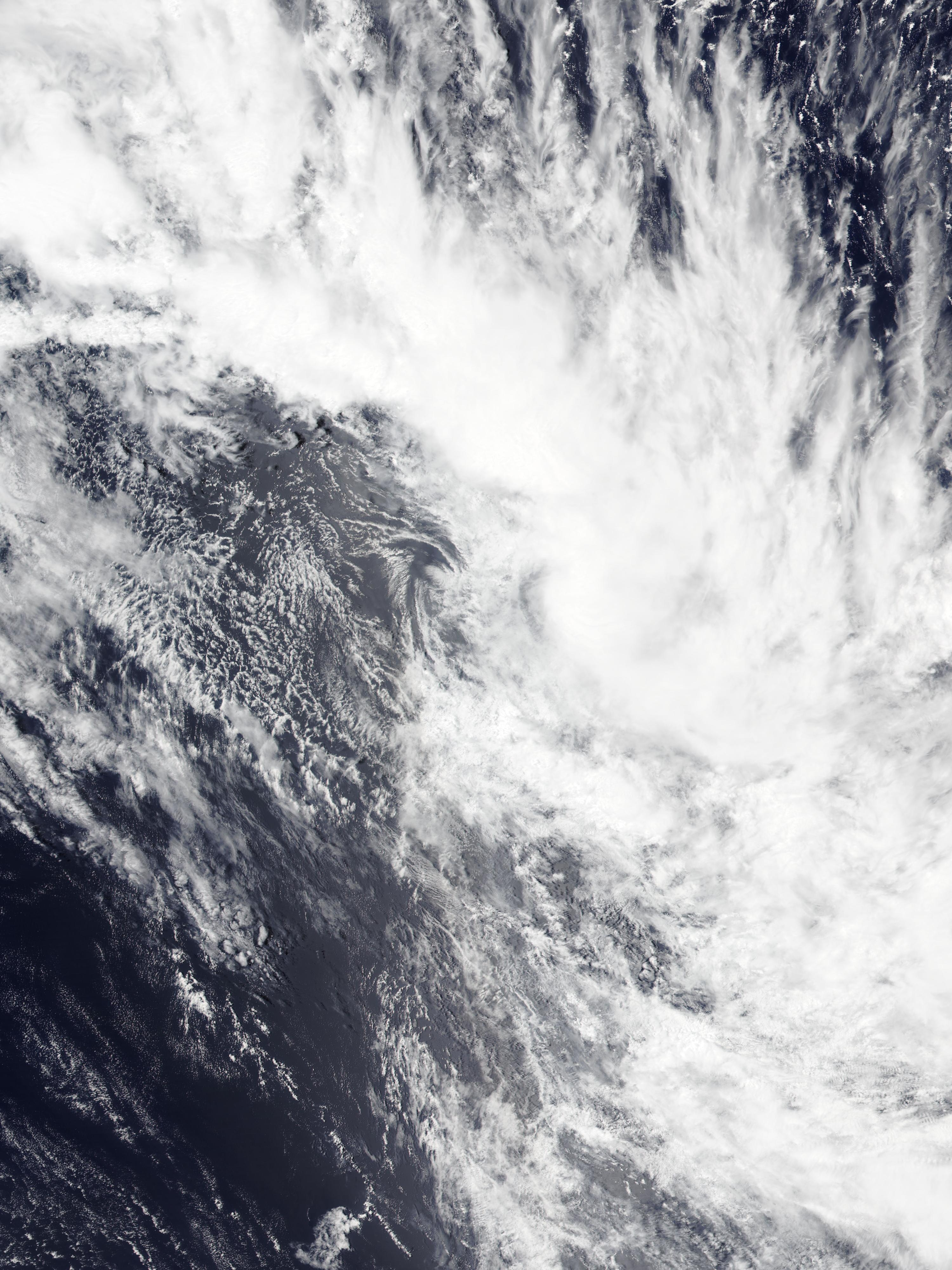
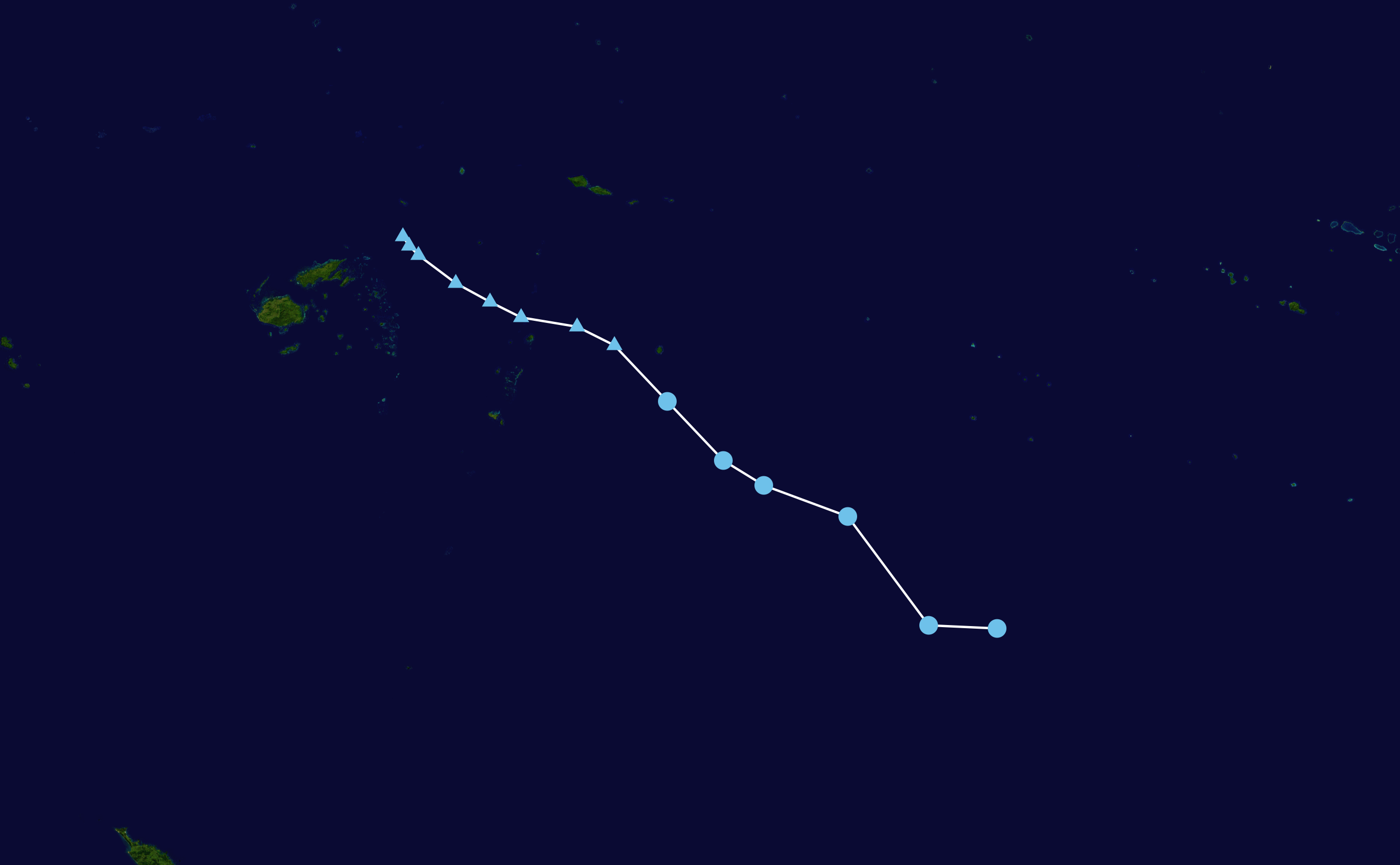
- Duration: 5 January – 8 January
- Peak intensity: Winds not specified; 997 hPa (mbar)

On 5 January, a low-pressure area formed near Samoa. The Fiji Meteorological Service (FMS) noticed it and designated it as a tropical disturbance on the same day, stating it lay within a low sheared environment with good upper divergence, and over sea surface temperature at 30°C. FMS analysed the potential for tropical cyclone development to be low to moderate. Later that day, the FMS downgraded it to a very low chance. After heading southeastward, it became extratropical on 8 January, causing the FMS to cease advisories.

=== Tropical Cyclone Pita ===
- Category 1 tropical cyclone (Australian scale)
- Tropical storm (SSHWS)
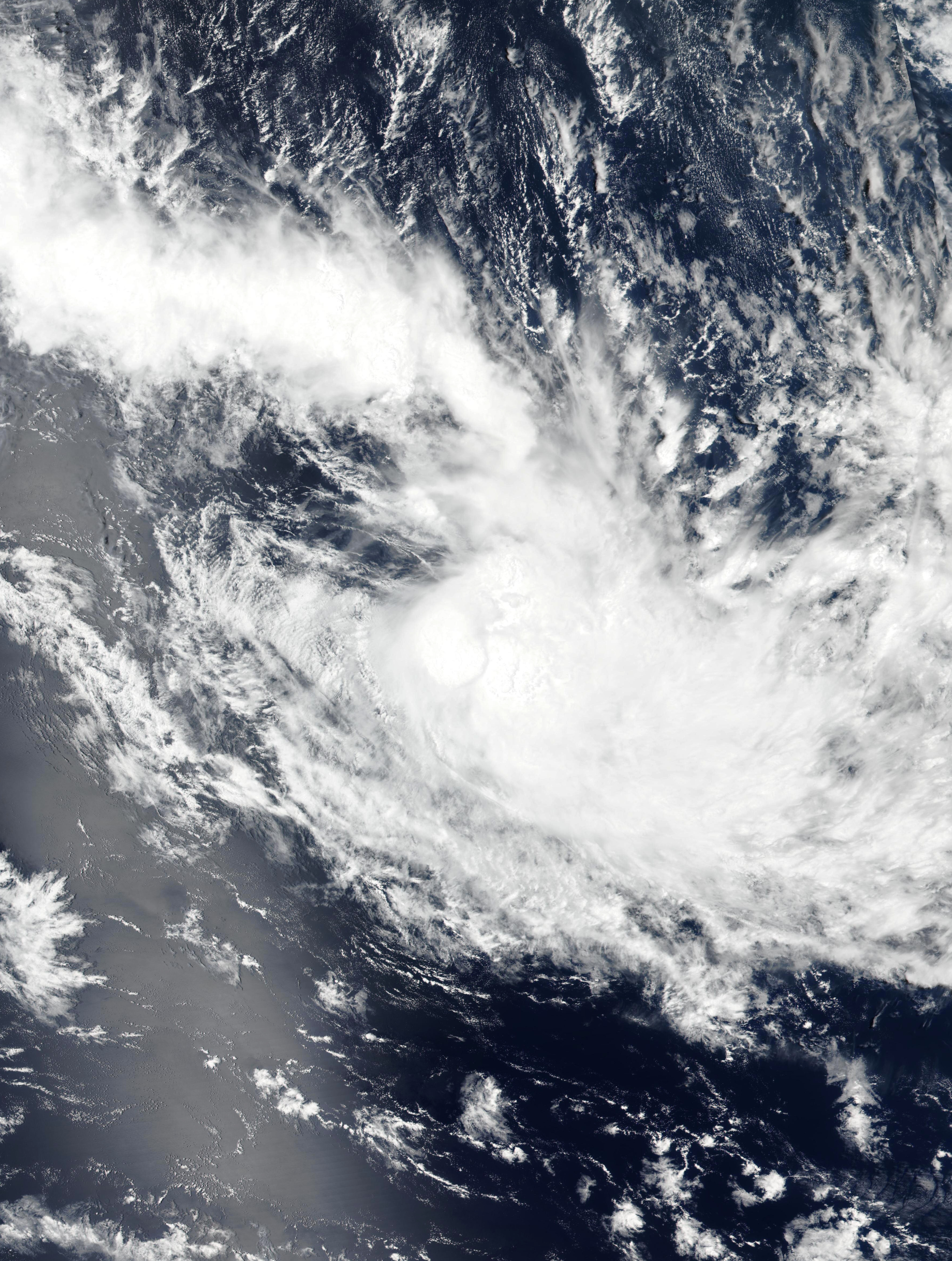
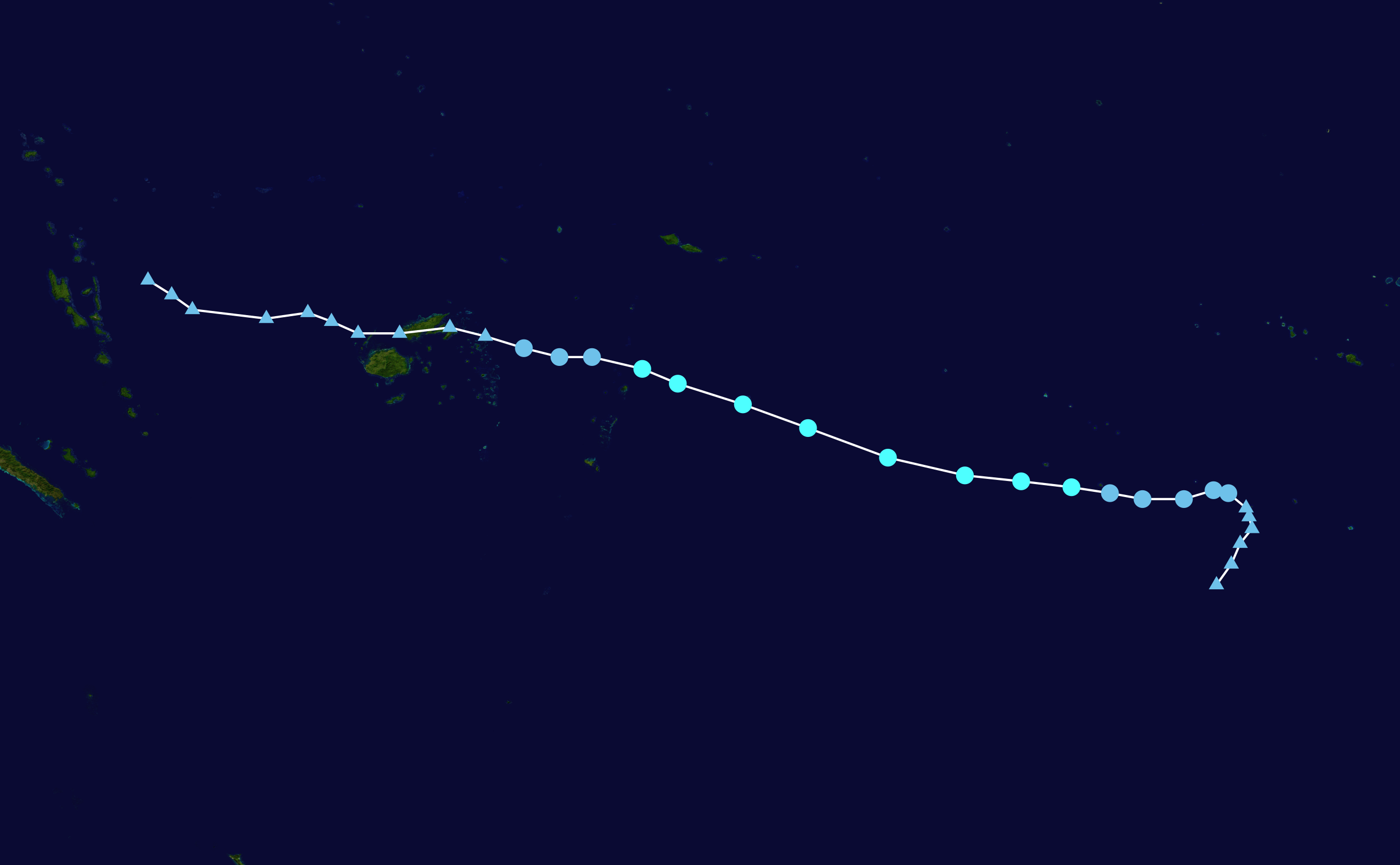
- Duration: 9 January – 12 January
- Peak intensity: 65 km/h (40 mph) (10-min); 995 hPa (mbar)

The Fiji Meteorological Service named Cyclone Pita as the first tropical cyclone of the season. The storm passed over Niue and Cook Islands before being downgraded to a depression.

Heavy rains associated with the tropical cyclone caused flooding in Fiji and Samoa. In Fiji, this flooding resulted in isolated damages, including the collapse of a bridge, although no fatalities were reported.

=== Tropical Depression 05F ===
- Tropical depression (Australian scale)
- Tropical storm (SSHWS)
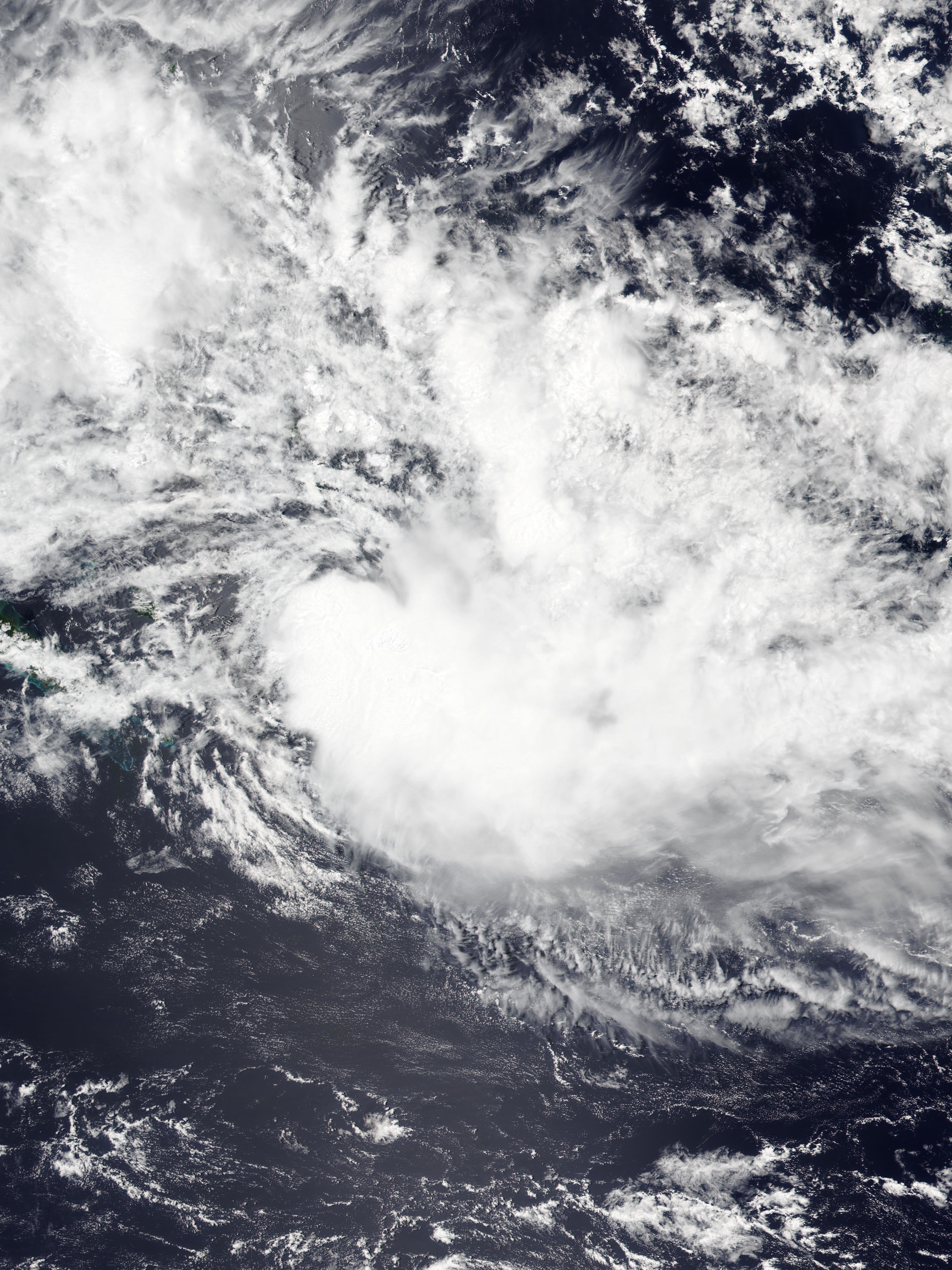
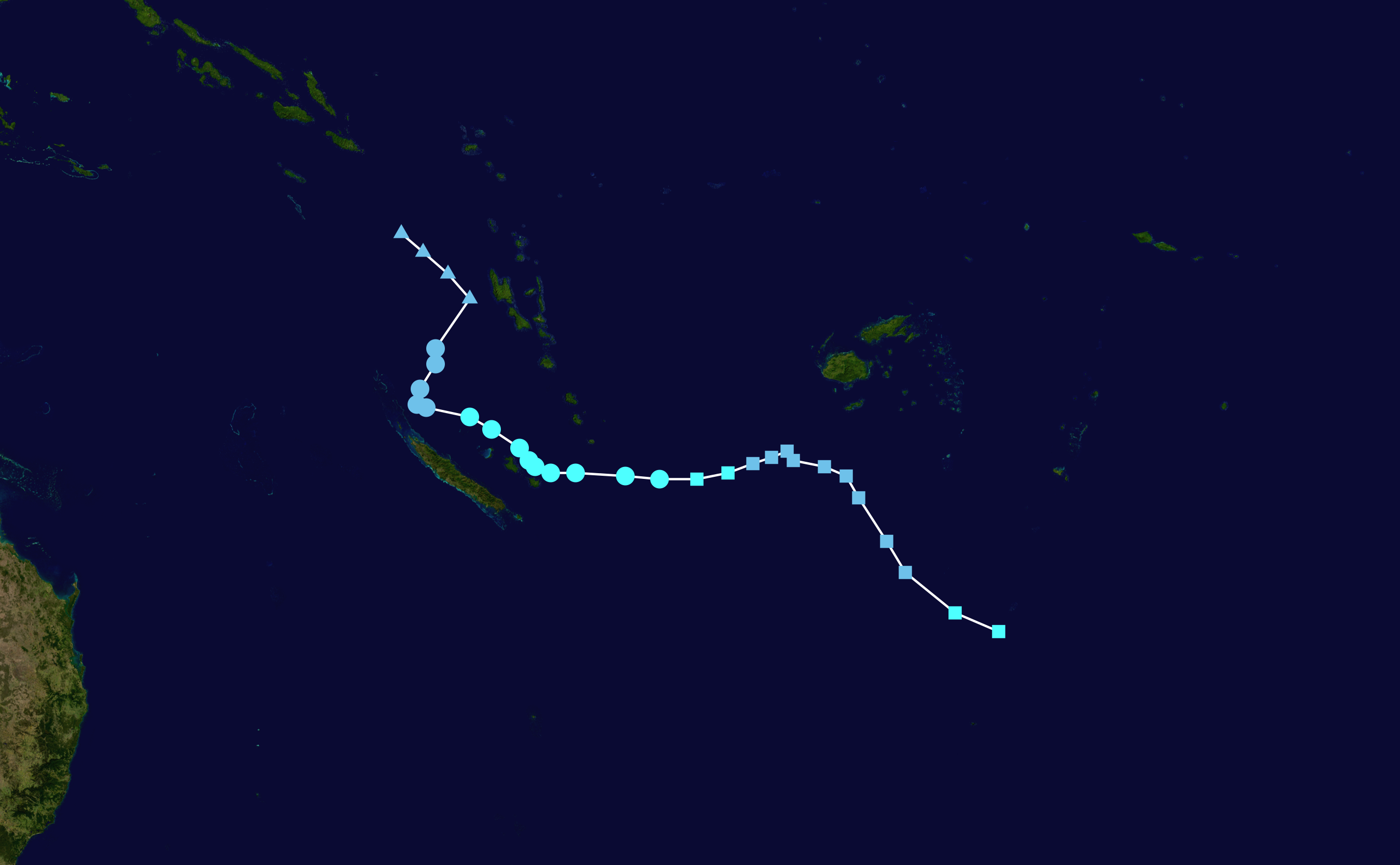
- Duration: 31 January – 5 February
- Peak intensity: 85 km/h (50 mph) (1-min); 997 hPa (mbar)

Tropical Depression 05F was a tropical storm that formed on 31 January. This tropical storm was close to the Loyalty Islands, causing damages and no electricity, until it dissipated on 5 February.

=== Tropical Disturbance 06F ===
- Tropical disturbance (Australian scale)
- Subtropical storm (SSHWS)
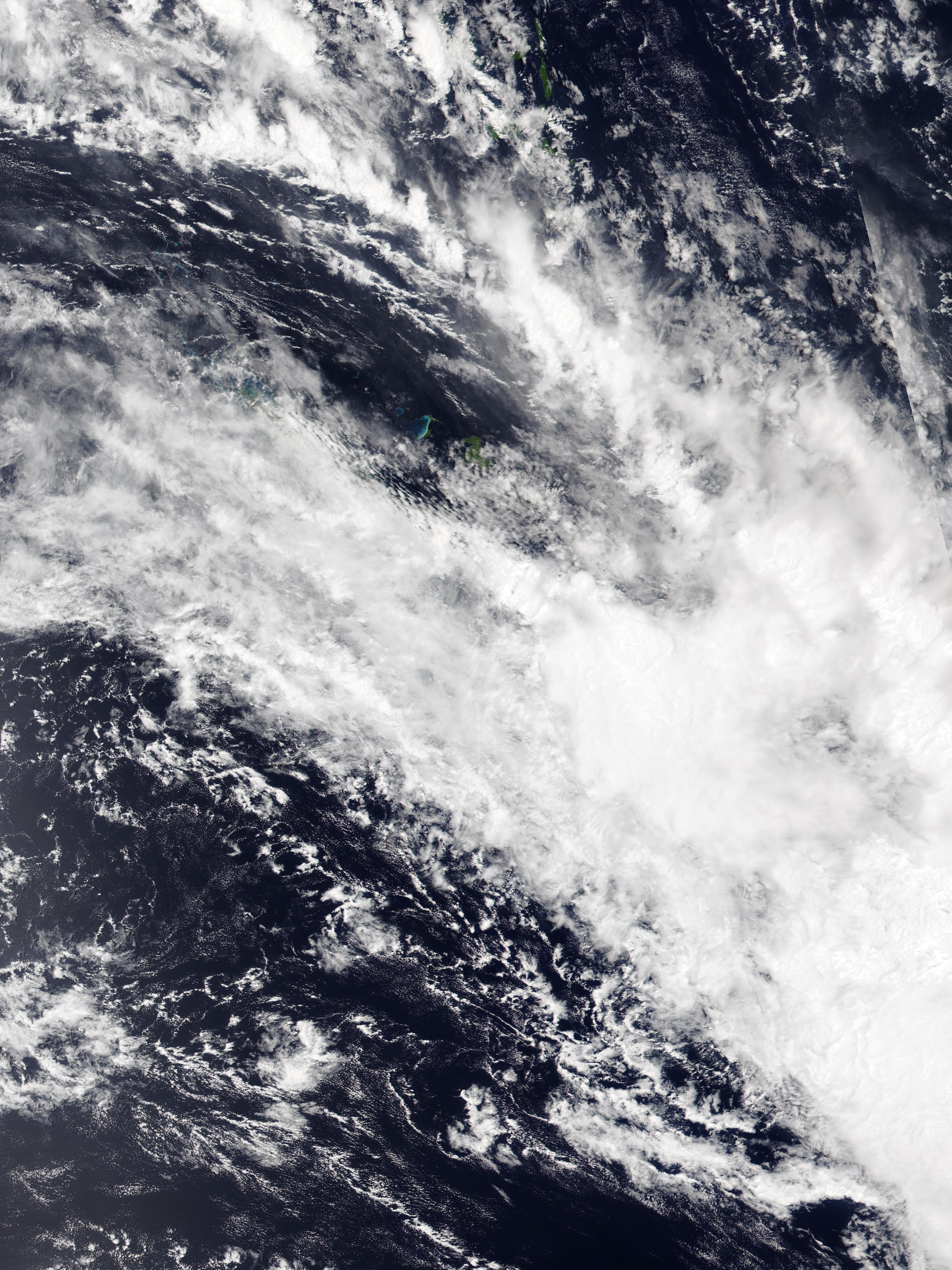
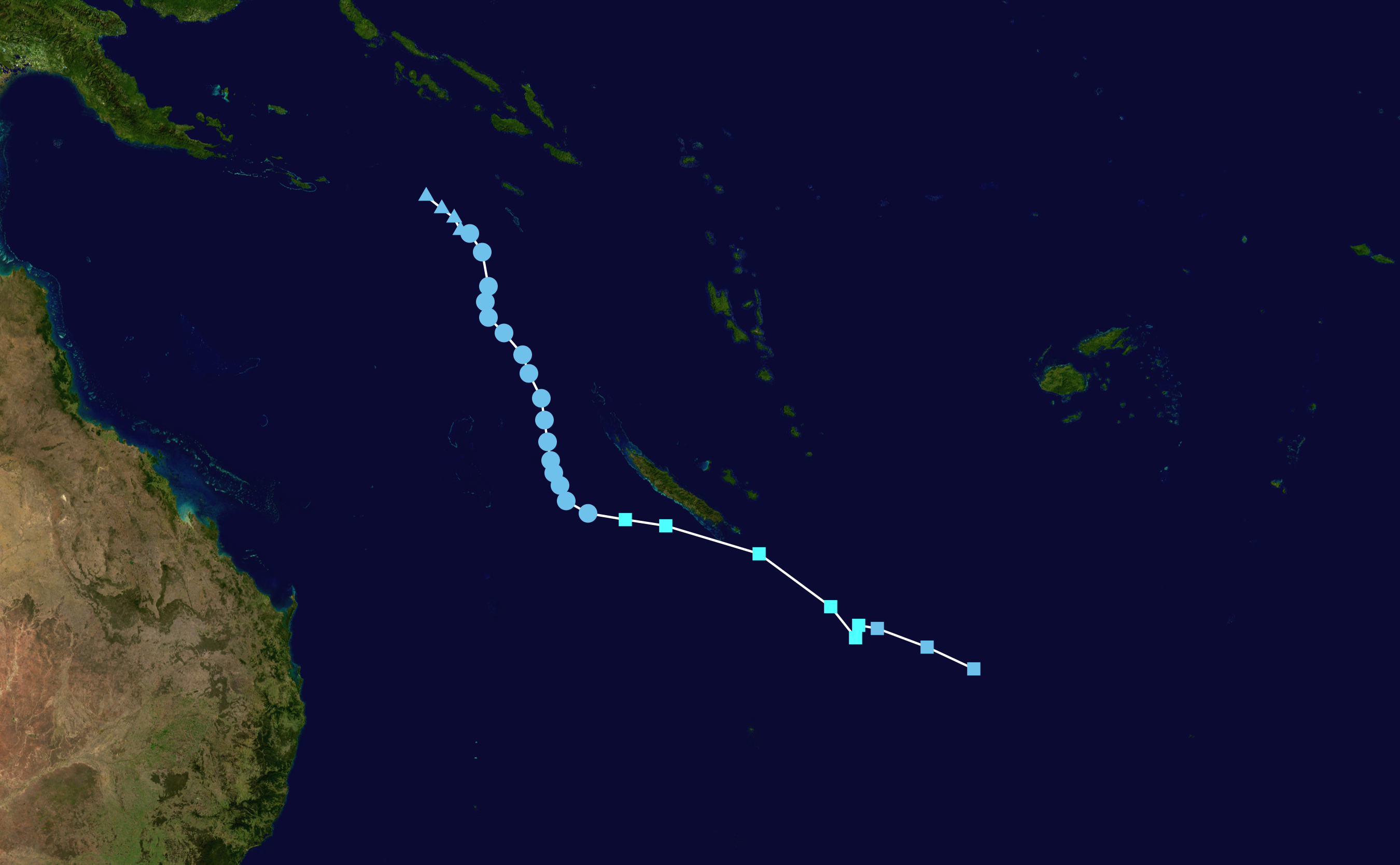
- Duration: 4 February (Entered basin) – 8 February
- Peak intensity: 75 km/h (45 mph) (1-min); 996 hPa (mbar)

=== Tropical Depression 07F ===
- Tropical depression (Australian scale)
- Tropical storm (SSHWS)
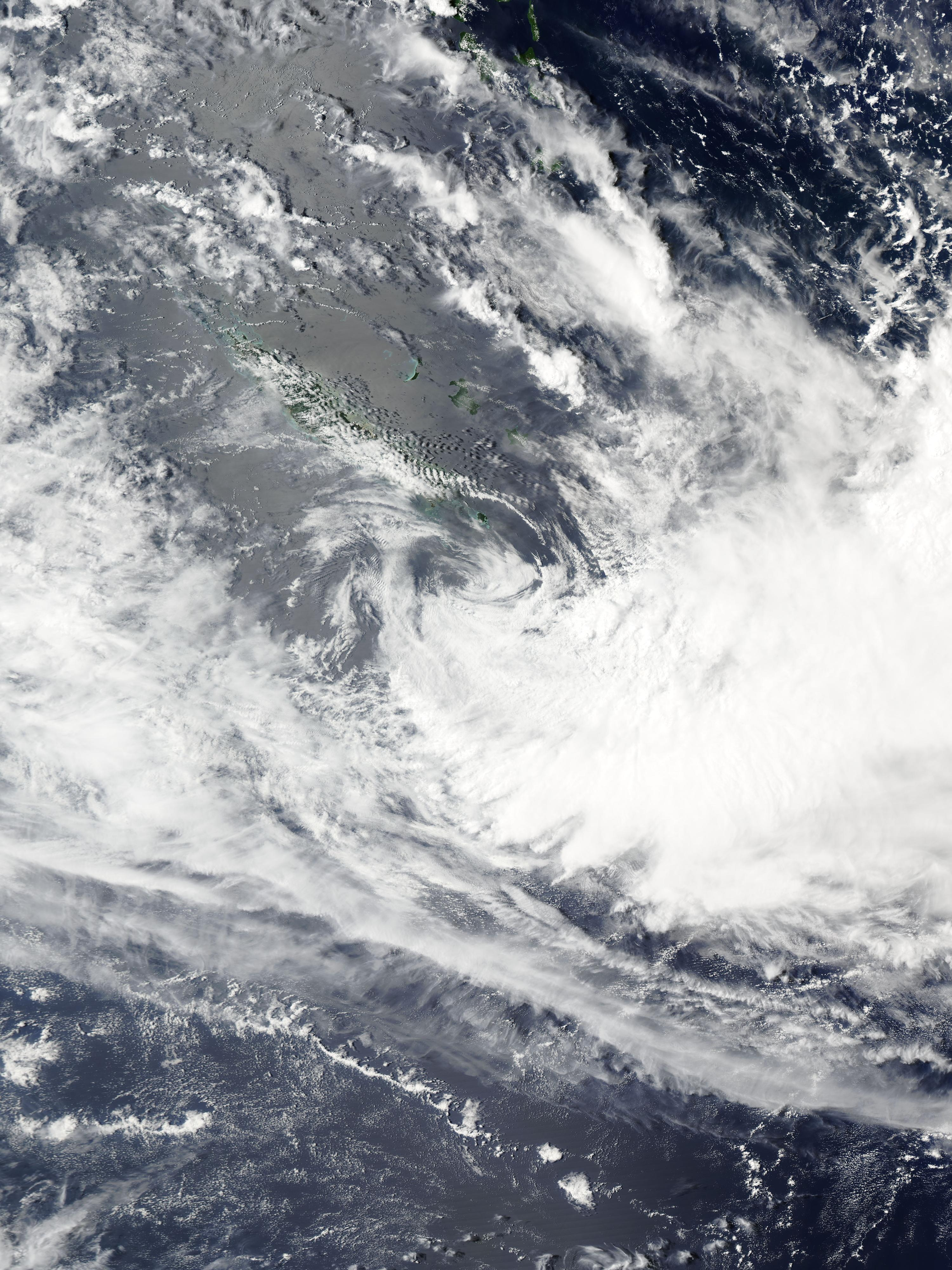
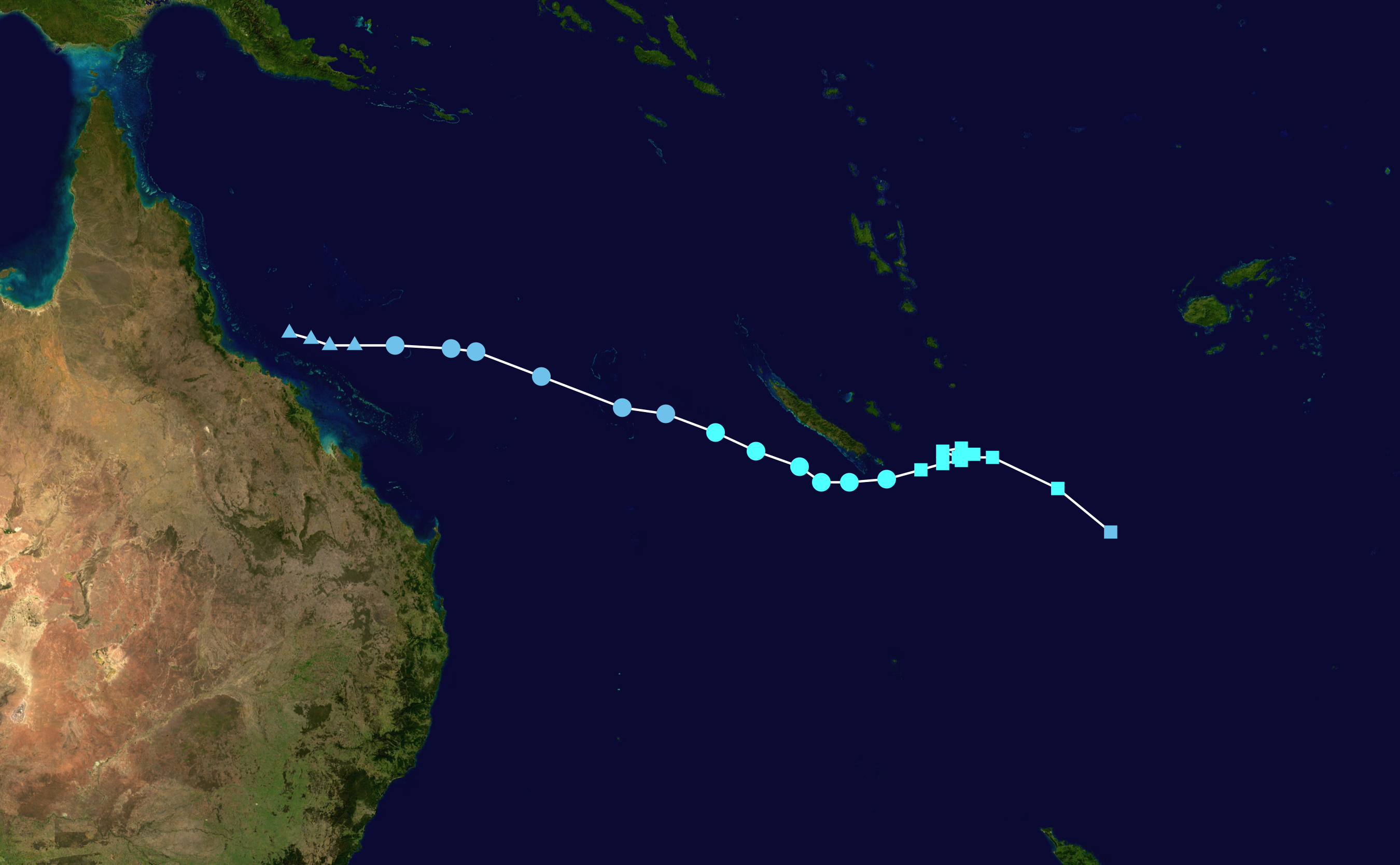
- Duration: 11 February (Entered basin) – 13 February
- Peak intensity: 75 km/h (45 mph) (1-min); 998 hPa (mbar)

=== Tropical Depression 08F ===
- Tropical depression (Australian scale)
- Tropical storm (SSHWS)
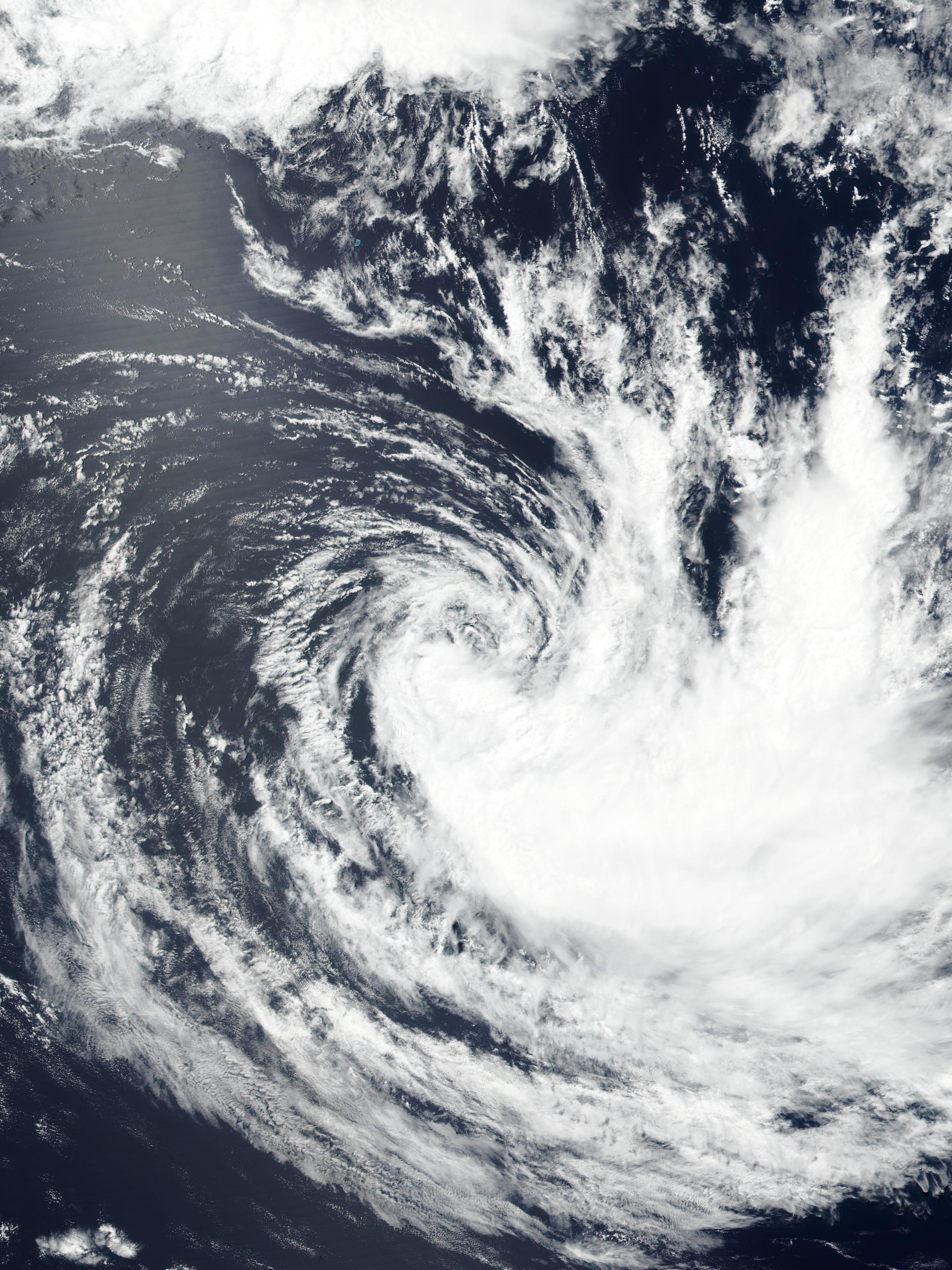
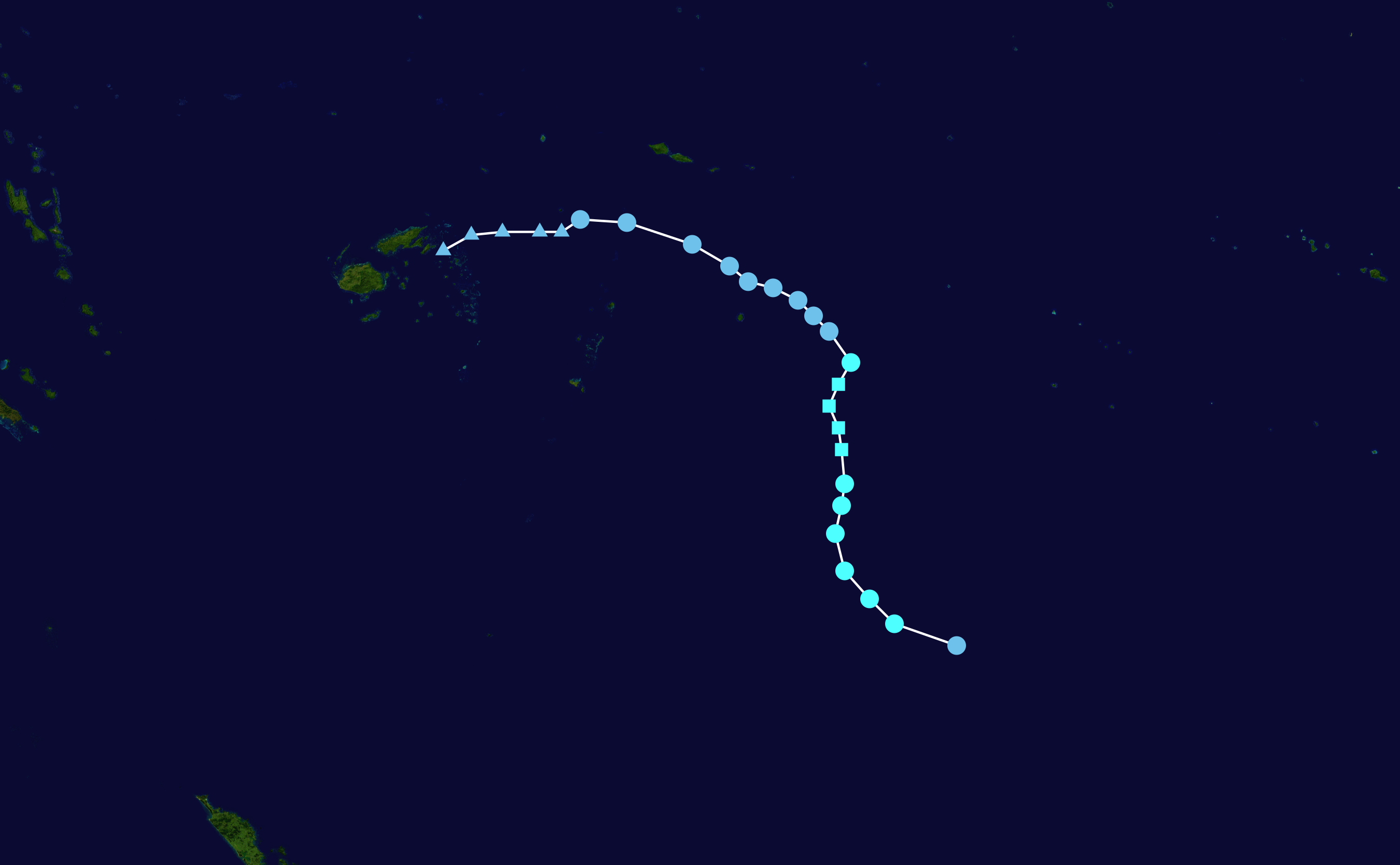
- Duration: 19 February – 22 February
- Peak intensity: 95 km/h (60 mph) (1-min); 998 hPa (mbar)

=== Tropical Cyclone Rae ===
- Category 2 tropical cyclone (Australian scale)
- Category 3 tropical cyclone (SSHWS)
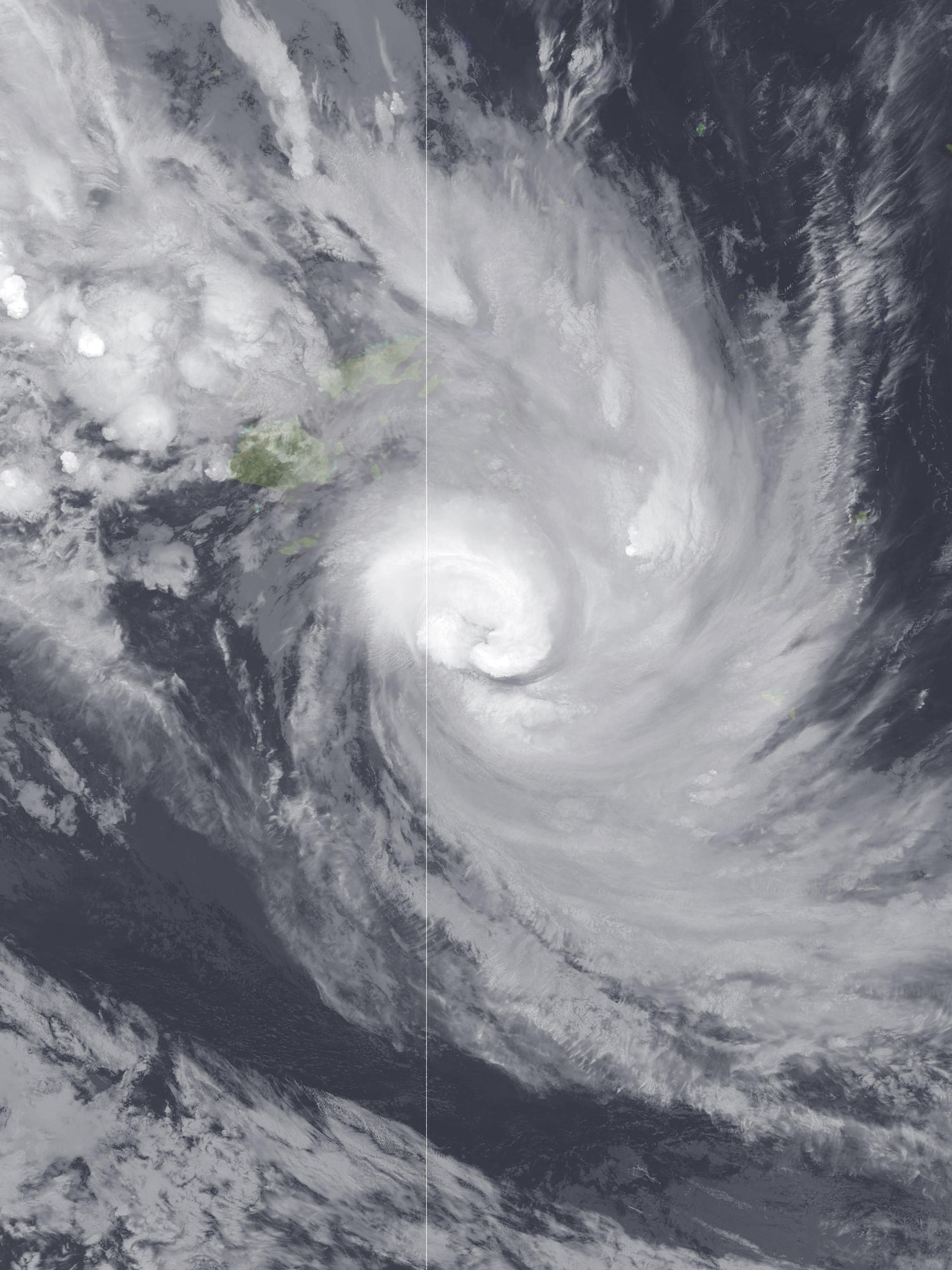
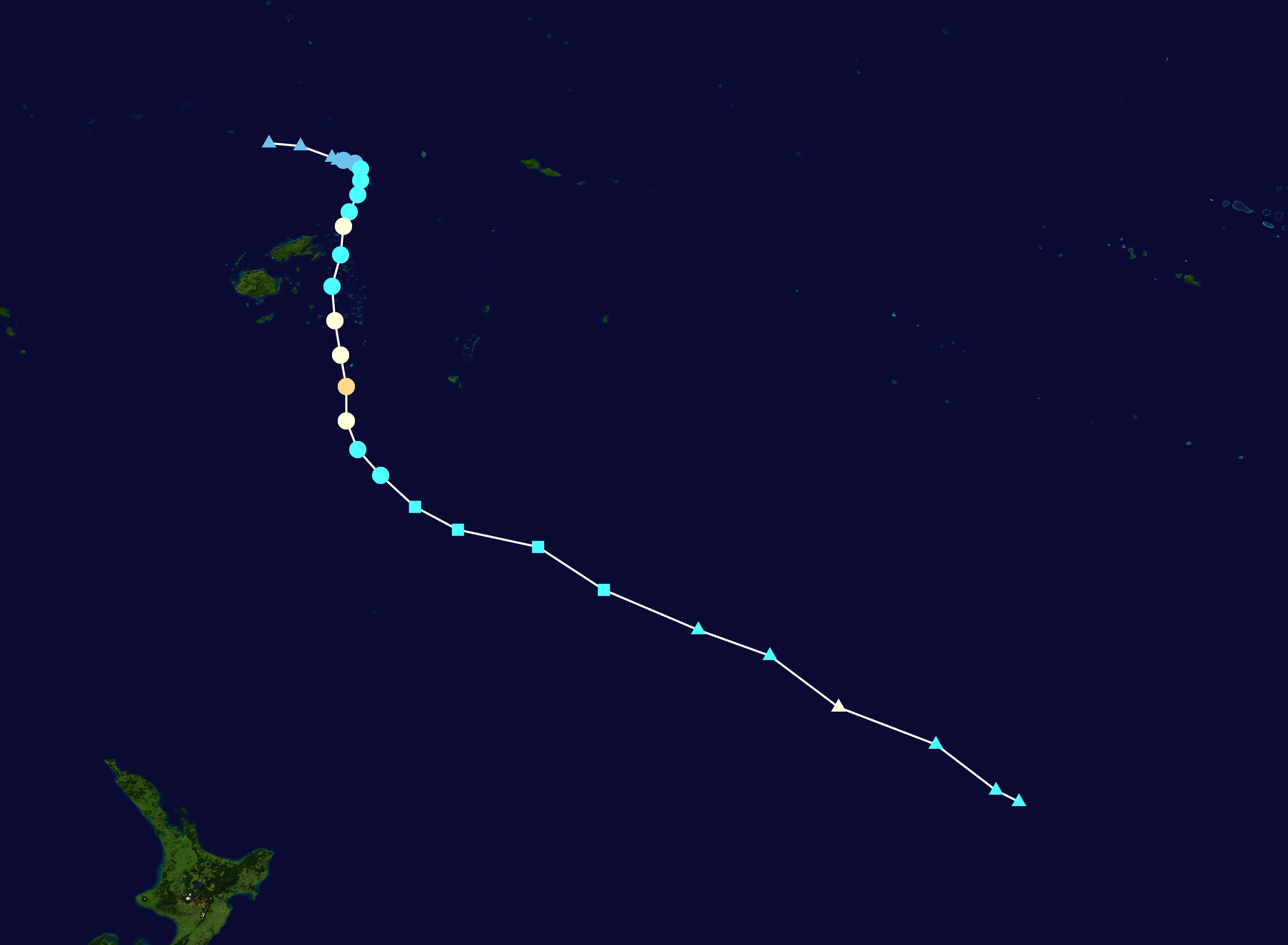
- Duration: 22 February – 26 February
- Peak intensity: 110 km/h (70 mph) (10-min); 975 hPa (mbar)

On 22 February, the FMS designated Tropical Depression 09F and later had a moderate to high chance to become a tropical cyclone. On 23 February at 06:00 UTC, the FMS named Tropical Cyclone Rae. Rae brought heavy rainfall and triggered flooding to parts of Fiji. In Sawana, a lot of trees were uprooted by strong winds and blocked roads on Vanua Balavu. Farms were destroyed and the village suffered from food and water shortage.

=== Tropical Cyclone Seru ===
- Category 2 tropical cyclone (Australian scale)
- Category 1 tropical cyclone (SSHWS)
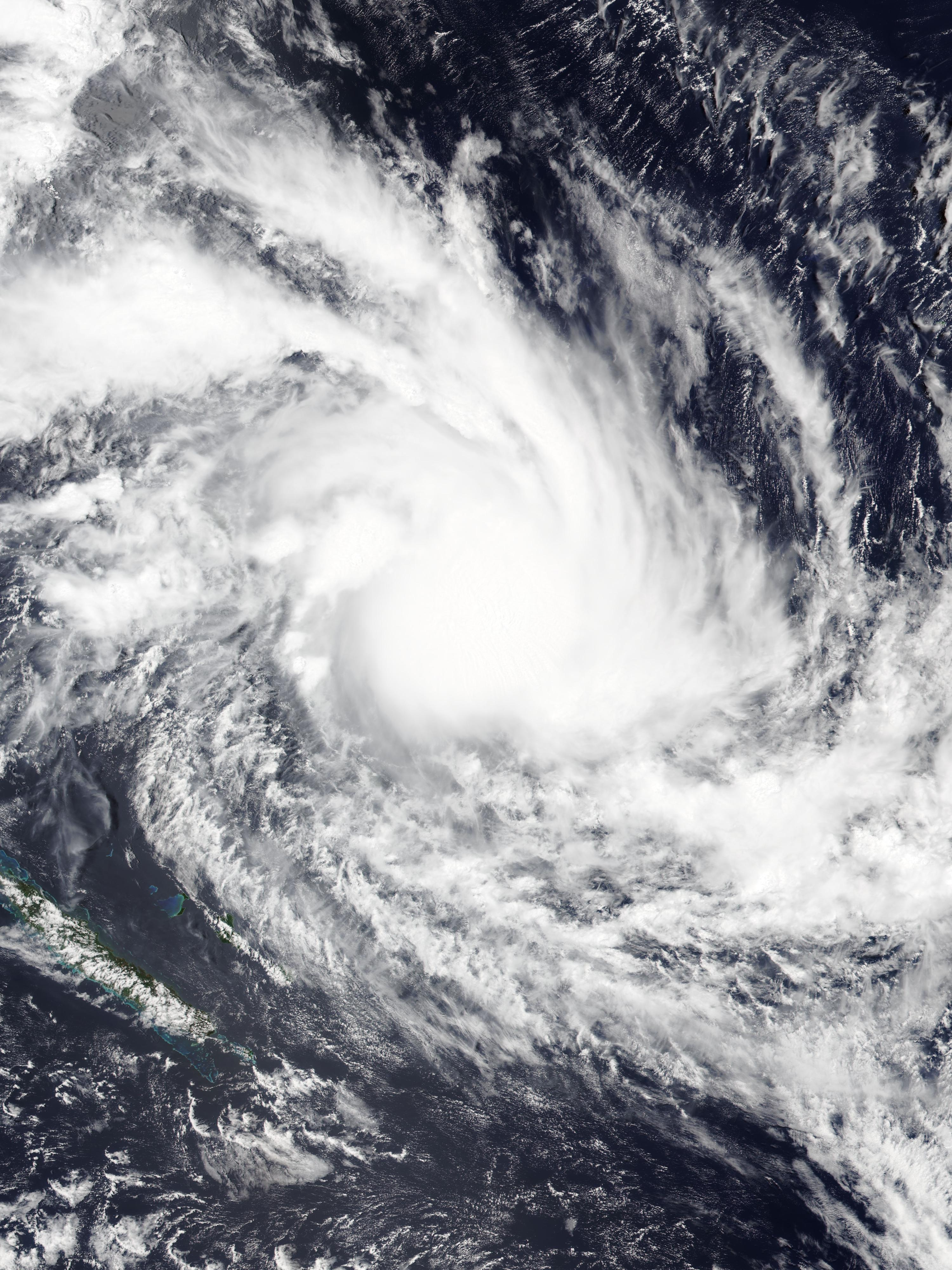
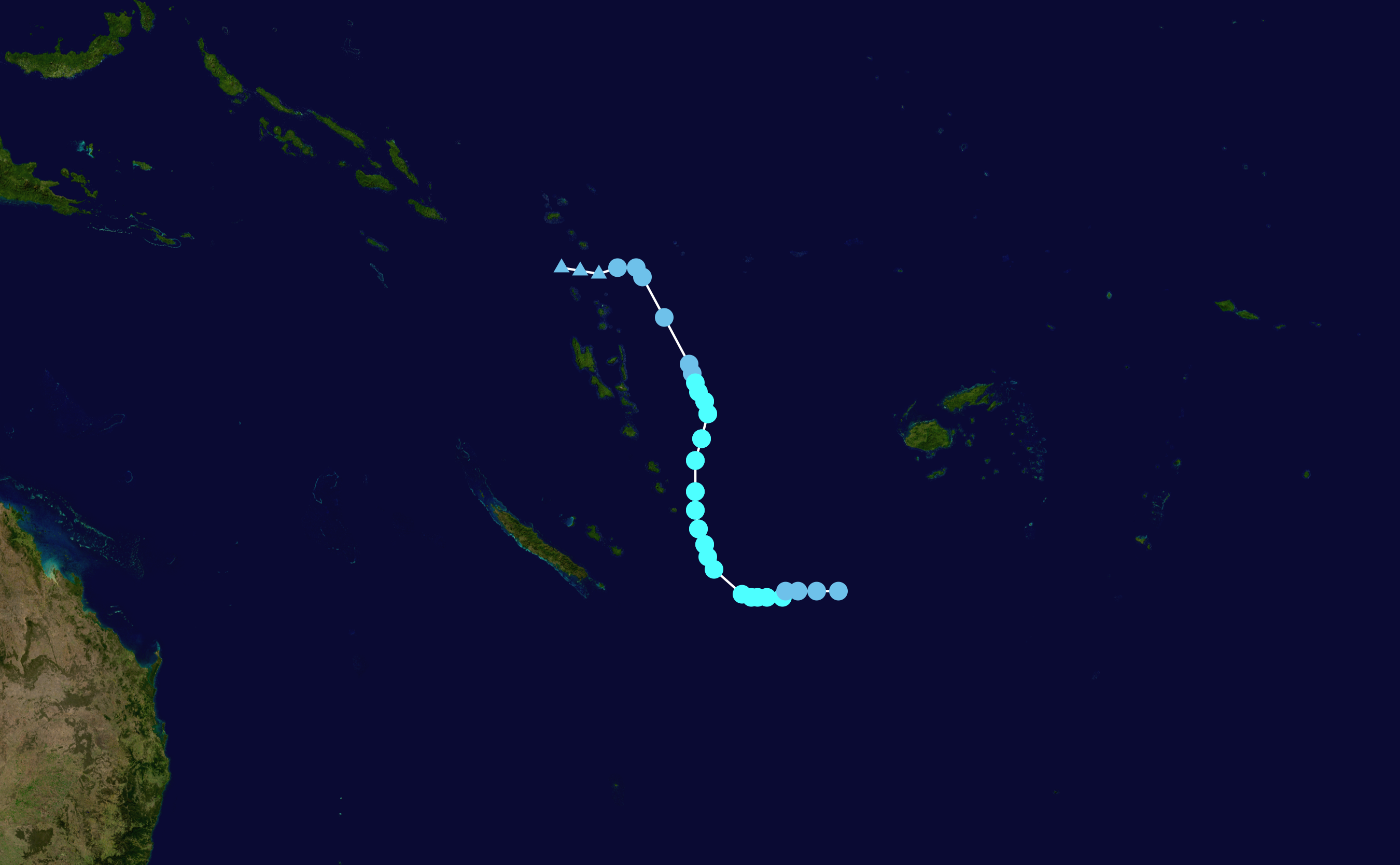
- Duration: 24 February – 27 February
- Peak intensity: 110 km/h (70 mph) (10-min); 980 hPa (mbar)

On 24 February, Tropical Cyclone Seru formed northeast of Vanuatu. It slowly intensified while tracking south over the next few days, becoming a Category 2 tropical cyclone on the Australian scale. Seru caused minimal damage in southern Vanuatu, and dissipated into a remnant low on 1 March.

=== Tropical Cyclone Tam ===
- Category 1 tropical cyclone (Australian scale)
- Tropical storm (SSHWS)
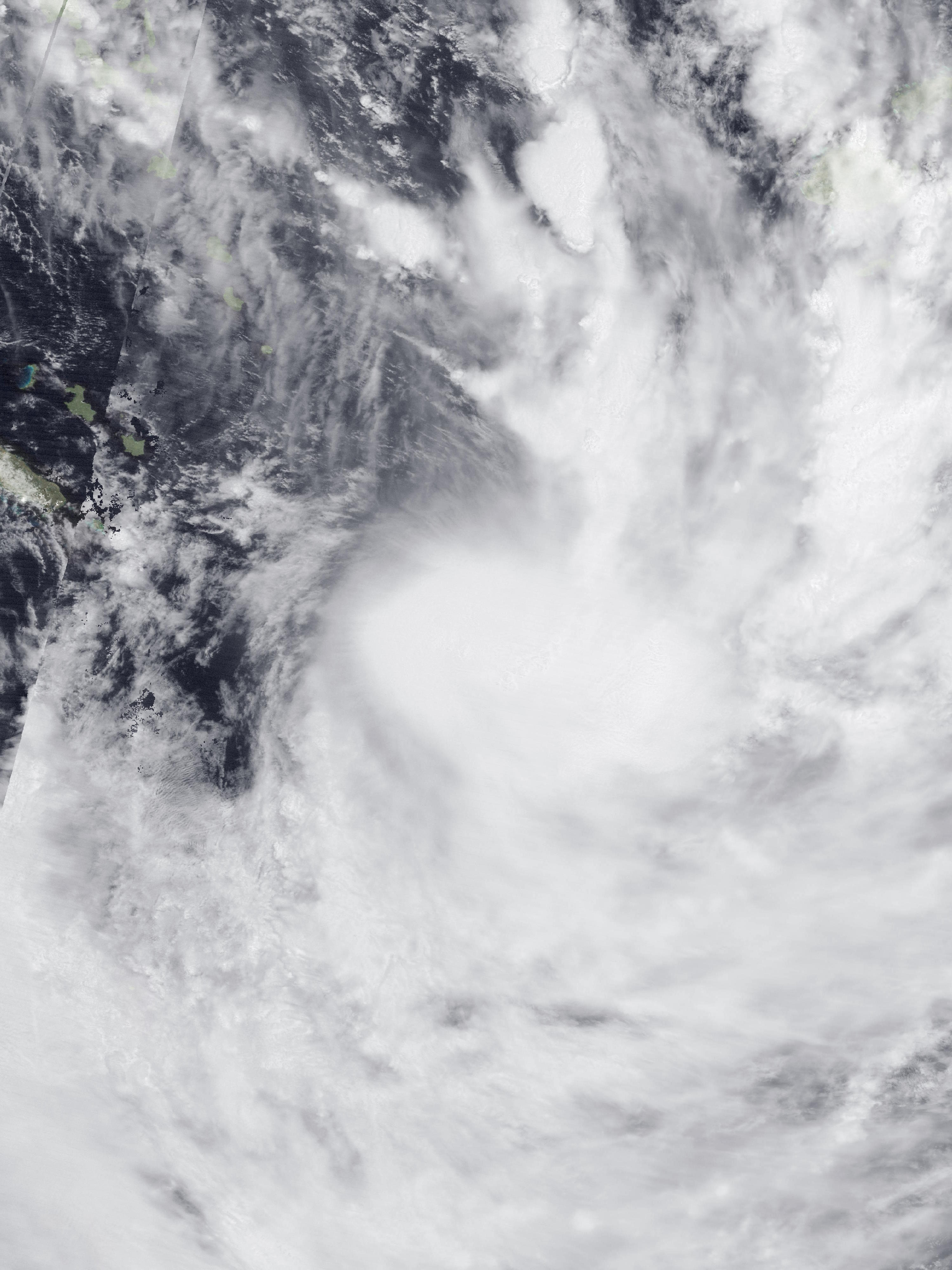
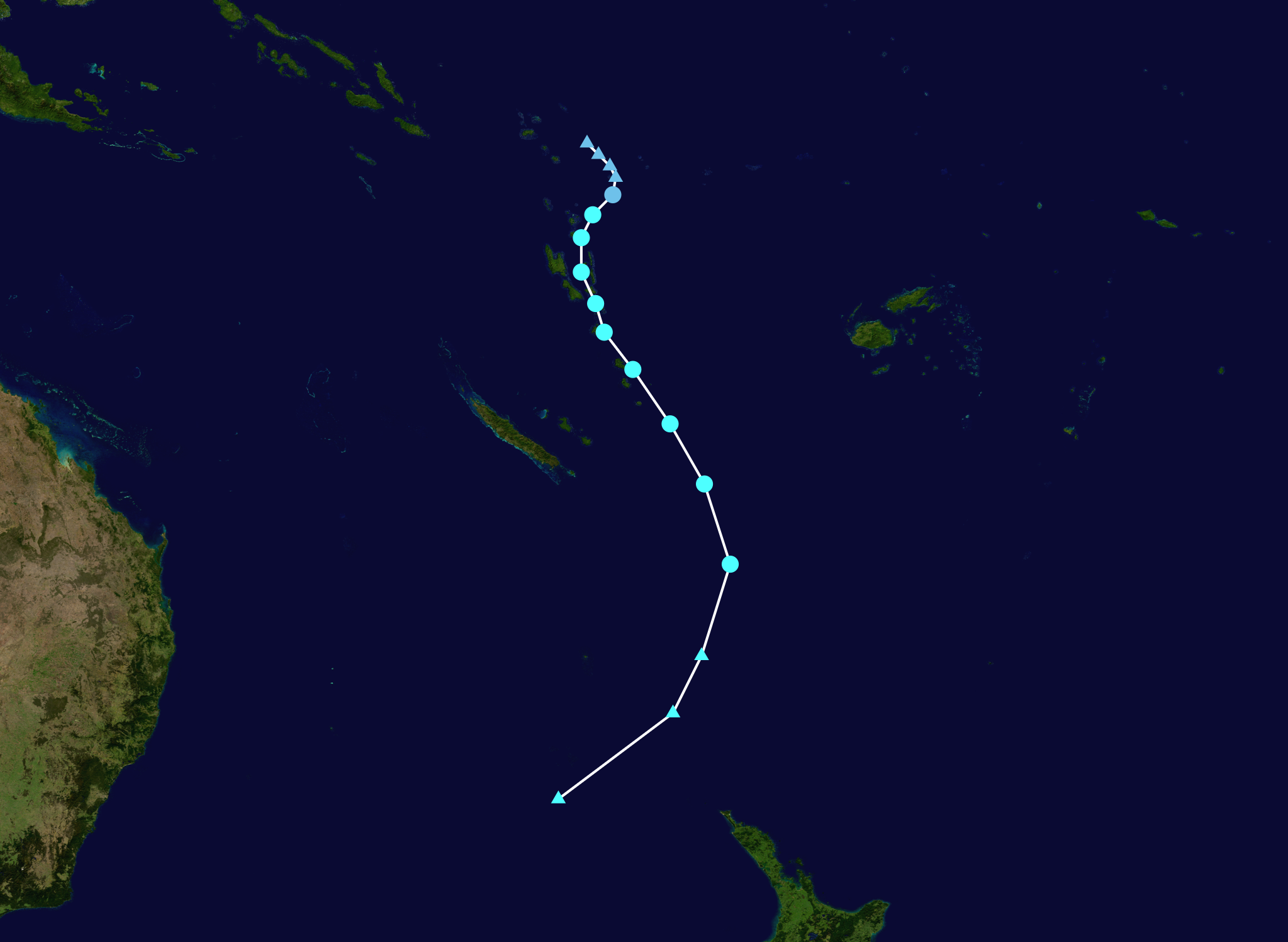
- Duration: 14 April – 16 April
- Peak intensity: 85 km/h (50 mph) (10-min); 986 hPa (mbar)

Tropical Cyclone Tam was named on 14 April by the Fiji Meteorological Service. By 15 April Tam peaked at 85km/h winds and 986 hpa. Tam transitioned into a deep subtropical cyclone on 16 April and caused severe weather conditions in northern New Zealand, leading to power outages and travel disruptions in the Northland Region and Auckland. Strong waves caused by Tam resulted in 5 drownings in New South Wales. By 17 April, Cyclone Tam had caused power outages at 6,000 properties in Northland, the Coromandel Peninsula, Bay of Plenty and Gisborne.

By 18 April, Cyclone Tam had caused flooding in the Coromandel Peninsula, disrupting roads and highways. In addition, flooding and strong winds were also reported in the Far North District, causing road closures and flight disruptions. By 19 April, Auckland authorities had issued an emergency alert in response to flooding, thunderstorms and travel disruptions. On 20 April, Auckland authorities issued a second emergency alert in response to flooding caused by Cyclone Tam.

By 21 April, ex-tropical Cyclone Tam had begun to ease despite heavy rain and thunderstorms in parts of the North and South Island. At its peak, 24,000 homes in Northland had experienced power outages. By 21 April, fewer than 100 houses in Northland remained without power. The Auckland Council inspected 16 properties that had experienced flooding. By 22 April, line companies had restored power to most houses in Northland, with about 25 Far North homes still remaining disconnected.

=== Other systems ===
On 13 December, a subtropical cyclone formed near the Cook Islands and was designated 95P by the Joint Typhoon Warning Center. It transitioned into an extratropical cyclone on 17 December.

On 10 May, another subtropical cyclone also designated 95P formed southwest of Fiji.

== Storm names ==
Within the Southern Pacific, a tropical depression is judged to have reached tropical cyclone intensity should it reach winds of 65 km/h (40 mph) and it is evident that gales are occurring at least halfway around the center. Tropical depressions intensifying into a tropical cyclone between the Equator and 26°S and between 160°E - 120°W are named by the FMS; should a tropical depression intensify to the south of 26°S between 160°E and 120°W it will be named in conjunction with the FMS by MetService. The names Pita and Seru were used for the first time this year, as they replaced Percy and Sheila after the 2004–05 season. Should a tropical cyclone move out of the basin and into the Australian region it will retain its original name. The names that were used for the 2024–25 season are listed below:

- Pita
- Rae
- Seru
- Tam

=== Retirement ===
After the season, the name Rae was retired and replaced with the name Rex during the 2025 RA V Tropical Cyclone Committee meeting.

== Season effects ==
This table lists all the storms that developed in the South Pacific to the east of longitude 160°E during the 2024–25 season. It includes their intensity on the Australian tropical cyclone intensity scale, duration, name, landfalls, deaths, and damages. All data is taken from RSMC Nadi and/or TCWC Wellington, and all of the damage figures are in 2024 or 2025 USD.

Name	Dates	Peak intensity			Areas affected	Damage (USD)	Deaths	Ref(s).
Name	Dates	Category	Wind speed	Pressure	Areas affected	Damage (USD)	Deaths	Ref(s).
01F	December 28 – 30	Tropical depression	Not specified	1004 hPa (29.65 inHg)	Fiji	None	None	
02F	December 31, 2024 – January 2, 2025	Tropical disturbance	Not specified	1006 hPa (29.71 inHg)	None	None	None	
03F	January 5 – 8	Tropical disturbance	Not specified	997 hPa (29.44 inHg)	Samoa, Niue	None	None	
Pita	January 9 – 12	Category 1 tropical cyclone	65 km/h (40 mph)	995 hPa (29.38 inHg)	Tonga, Niue, Cook Islands	None	None	
05F	January 31 – February 5	Tropical depression	Not specified	997 hPa (29.44 inHg)	Loyalty Islands, Vanuatu	None	None	
06F	February 4 – 8	Tropical disturbance	Not specified	996 hPa (29.41 inHg)	New Caledonia	None	None	
07F	February 11 – 13	Tropical depression	Not specified	998 hPa (29.47 inHg)	New Caledonia	None	None	
08F	February 19 – 22	Tropical depression	Not specified	998 hPa (29.47 inHg)	Niue	None	None	
Rae	February 22 – 26	Category 2 tropical cyclone	110 km/h (70 mph)	975 hPa (28.79 inHg)	Fiji, Wallis and Futuna, Tonga	Unknown	None	
Seru	February 24 – 27	Category 2 tropical cyclone	110 km/h (70 mph)	980 hPa (28.94 inHg)	Fiji, Vanuatu	None	None	
Tam	April 14 – 16	Category 1 tropical cyclone	85 km/h (50 mph)	986 hPa (29.12 inHg)	Vanuatu, Norfolk Island, New Zealand, Australia (New South Wales)	Unknown	0 (6)	
Season aggregates
11 systems	28 December 2024 – 16 April 2025		110 km/h (70 mph)	975 hPa (28.79 inHg)		Unknown	0 (6)	

== See also ==
- Weather of 2024 and 2025
- List of Southern Hemisphere cyclone seasons
- Tropical cyclones in 2024 and 2025
- Atlantic hurricane seasons: 2024, 2025
- Pacific hurricane seasons: 2024, 2025
- Pacific typhoon seasons: 2024, 2025
- North Indian Ocean cyclone seasons: 2024, 2025
- 2024–25 South-West Indian Ocean cyclone season
- 2024–25 Australian region cyclone season
