= Sovi Basin =

Basin in Naitasiri Province, Fiji

Sovi Basin Protected Area
- IUCN category II (national park)
- Interactive map of Sovi Basin Protected Area
- Location: Viti Levu, Fiji
- Nearest city: Suva
- Coordinates: 17°59′1″S 178°10′56″E
- Area: 20 km^{2} (7.7 sq mi)
- Established: 2006
- Governing body: National Trust of Fiji

The Sovi Basin is located in Naitasiri Province, on the island of Viti Levu, the largest island in Fiji. Covering approximately 19,600 hectares, the basin is blanketed by a well-preserved tropical lowland forest, which is Fiji's largest and most biologically diverse. Sovi basin resides within the Polynesia/Micronesia biodiversity hotspot, one of 34 hot spots throughout the globe. The site is to be protected in a partnership between Fiji Water and Conservation International. The organisation’s Fiji country programme, Conservation International Fiji, supported work contributing to the establishment of the conservation area, including stakeholder coordination and development of management and conservation-lease arrangements with landowners. The rainforest, wilderness area and high scenic valley contribute to its national significance as outlined in Fiji's Biodiversity Strategy and Action Plan.

A 40,700 hectares (101,000 acres) area covering the basin is the Sovi Basin Important Bird Area. This area supports the largest protected populations of many of Fiji's restricted-range species, including the endangered Long-legged thicketbird, the vulnerable Pink-billed parrotfinch and Shy Ground-dove, and the near threatened Masked shining parrot.

== World Heritage Status ==
This site was added to the UNESCO World Heritage Tentative List on October 26, 1999 in the Cultural category.
