= List of Category 5 Australian region severe tropical cyclones =

Cyclone Maila near peak intensity on 7 April.

A Category 5 severe tropical cyclone is a tropical cyclone that reaches Category 5 intensity on the Australian tropical cyclone intensity scale within the Australian region. They are by definition the strongest tropical cyclones that can form on Earth. A total of 48 recorded tropical cyclones have peaked at Category 5 strength in the Australian region, which is denoted as the part of the Southern Hemisphere between 90°E and 160°E. The earliest tropical cyclone to be classified as a Category 5 severe tropical cyclone was Pam which was classified as a Category 5 between February 3 and 5, 1974, as it moved through the Coral Sea. The latest system to be classified as a Category 5 severe tropical cyclone was Cyclone Maila, which was classified on April 8, 2026.

== Background ==
The Australian region tropical cyclone basin is located to the south of the Equator between 90°E and 160°E and is officially monitored by the Indonesian Badan Meteorologi, Klimatologi, dan Geofisika (BMKG), Australian Bureau of Meteorology and the Papua New Guinea National Weather Service. Other meteorological services such as New Zealand's MetService, Météo-France as well as the Fiji Meteorological Service and the United States Joint Typhoon Warning Center monitor the basin. Within the basin a Category 5 severe tropical cyclone is a tropical cyclone that has 10-minute mean maximum sustained wind speeds over 107 knots (198 km/h; 123 mph) or greater on the Australian tropical cyclone intensity scale. A named storm could also be classified as a Category 5 tropical cyclone if it is estimated, to have 1-minute mean maximum sustained wind speeds over 137 knots (254 km/h; 158 mph) on the Saffir–Simpson hurricane wind scale. Within the basin this scale is not officially used, however, systems are commonly compared to the SSHWS using 1-minute sustained wind speeds from the United States Joint Typhoon Warning Center. On both scales, a Category 5 tropical cyclone is expected to cause widespread devastation, if it significantly impacts land at or near its peak intensity.

== 20th century ==
Name	Duration	Peak intensity		Areas affected	Damage (USD)	Deaths	Refs
Name	Duration	Wind speed	Pressure	Areas affected	Damage (USD)	Deaths	Refs
Trixie	15–22 February 1975	205 km/h (125 mph)	925 hPa (27.32 inHg)	Western Australia	$3.71 million	None	
Beverley	27–28 March 1975	205 km/h (125 mph)	929 hPa (27.43 inHg)	Western Australia	>$1 million		
Joan	5–7 December 1975	215 km/h (130 mph)	915 hPa (27.02 inHg)	Western Australia	$25 million	None	
Alby	27 March – 5 April 1978	205 km/h (125 mph)	930 hPa (27.46 inHg)	Western Australia	10 million	5	
Amy	9–10 January 1980	215 km/h (130 mph)	915 hPa (27.02 inHg)	Indonesia, Western Australia			
Dean	31 January – 1 February 1980	205 km/h (125 mph)	930 hPa (27.46 inHg)	Indonesia, Northern Australia			
Enid	17 February 1980	205 km/h (125 mph)	930 hPa (27.46 inHg)	Western Australia			
Carol	16–17 December 1980	205 km/h (125 mph)	940 hPa (27.76 inHg)	Indonesia			
Mabel	18–19 January 1981	205 km/h (125 mph)	930 hPa (27.46 inHg)	Western Australia			
Dominic	7 April 1982	215 km/h (130 mph)	950 hPa (28.05 inHg)	Northern Australia, New Guinea			
Elinor	25 February 1983	205 km/h (125 mph)	935 hPa (27.61 inHg)	Queensland	Minor		
Kathy	16–24 March 1984	220 km/h (140 mph)	920 hPa (27.17 inHg)	Cape York Peninsula, Northern Territory	$12 million	1	
Harry	February 8–19, 1989	205 km/h (125 mph)	925 hPa (27.32 inHg)	Vanuatu, New Caledonia			
Aivu	31 March – 5 April 1989	205 km/h (125 mph)	935 hPa (27.61 inHg)	Queensland	$90 million	1	
Orson	17–24 April 1989	240 km/h (150 mph)	905 hPa (26.72 inHg)	Western Australia	$16 million	5	
Alex	19–20 March 1990	220 km/h (140 mph)	927 hPa (27.37 inHg)	Indonesia, Christmas Island			
Graham	5–6 December 1991	205 km/h (125 mph)	915 hPa (27.02 inHg)	Sumatra, Cocos Islands, Christmas Island			
Neville	9 April 1992	205 km/h (125 mph)	945 hPa (27.91 inHg)	Northern Territory			
Rewa	26 December 1993 – 23 January 1994	205 km/h (125 mph)	920 hPa (27.17 inHg)	New Caledonia, New Zealand, Papua New Guinea; Queensland, Solomon Islands, Vanuatu	Unknown	22	
Theodore	25 February 1994	215 km/h (130 mph)	910 hPa (26.87 inHg)	Solomon Islands, Papua New Guinea; Vanuatu, New Caledonia; Norfolk Island, New Zealand			
Chloe	7 April 1995	220 km/h (140 mph)	920 hPa (27.17 inHg)	Timor, Western Australia	None	None	
Pancho- Helinda	21–22 January 1997	215 km/h (130 mph)	910 hPa (26.87 inHg)	Sumatra, Cocos (Keeling) Islands, Madagascar			
Thelma	3–15 December 1998	220 km/h (140 mph)	920 hPa (27.17 inHg)	Northern Territory, Western Australia	N/A	1	
Frederic– Evrina	31 March 1999	205 km/h (125 mph)	920 hPa (27.17 inHg)	None	None	None	
Vance	16–23 March 1999	220 km/h (140 mph)	910 hPa (26.87 inHg)	Northern Territory, Western Australia	$303 million	None	
Gwenda	6 April 1999	220 km/h (140 mph)	900 hPa (26.58 inHg)	Timor, Indonesia, Western Australia			
John	14 December 1999	205 km/h (125 mph)	915 hPa (27.02 inHg)	Timor, Indonesia, Western Australia	196 million	None	

== 21st century ==
Name	Duration	Peak intensity		Areas affected	Damage (USD)	Deaths	Refs
Name	Duration	Wind speed	Pressure	Areas affected	Damage (USD)	Deaths	Refs
Paul	10–21 April 2000	205 km/h (125 mph)	915 hPa (27.02 inHg)	None	None	None	
Rosita	14–21 April 2000	220 km/h (140 mph)	930 hPa (27.46 inHg)	Indonesia, Western Australia, Northern Territory	Unknown	Unknown	
Sam	28 November–14 December 2000	205 km/h (125 mph)	940 hPa (27.76 inHg)	Northern Territory, Western Australia	Unknown	Unknown	
Chris	2–7 February 2002	205 km/h (125 mph)	915 hPa (27.02 inHg)	Western Australia	Unknown	Unknown	
Inigo	30 March – 8 April 2003	230 km/h (145 mph)	900 hPa (26.58 inHg)	Eastern Indonesia, Timor, Western Australia	Unknown	Unknown	
Fay	16–28 March 2004	215 km/h (130 mph)	910 hPa (26.87 inHg)	Northern Territory, Timor, Western Australia	Unknown	Unknown	
Ingrid	4–16 March 2005	230 km/h (145 mph)	924 hPa (27.29 inHg)	New Guinea, Northern Australia	Unknown	Unknown	
Glenda	28–29 March 2006	205 km/h (125 mph)	910 hPa (26.87 inHg)	Northern Territory, Western Australia	Unknown	Unknown	
Monica	16–27 April 2006	250 km/h (155 mph)	916 hPa (27.05 inHg)	New Guinea, Northern Australia	Unknown	Unknown	
George	27 February - 12 March 2007	205 km/h (125 mph)	902 hPa (26.64 inHg)	Northern Territory, Western Australia	Unknown	Unknown	
Hamish	5–12 March 2009	215 km/h (130 mph)	924 hPa (27.29 inHg)	Queensland	Unknown	Unknown	
Laurence	8–23 December 2009	205 km/h (125 mph)	925 hPa (27.32 inHg)	Northern Territory, Western Australia	Unknown	Unknown	
Yasi	31 January – 3 February 2011	205 km/h (125 mph)	929 hPa (27.43 inHg)	Vanuatu, Solomon Islands, Australia	$2.5 billion	1	
Gillian	6–27 March 2014	220 km/h (140 mph)	927 hPa (27.37 inHg)	New Guinea, Indonesia, Queensland; Northern Territory, Christmas Island	Unknown	Unknown	
Ita	5–15 April 2014	220 km/h (140 mph)	922 hPa (27.23 inHg)	Solomon Islands, Papua New Guinea, Queensland	Unknown	Unknown	
Marcia	15–21 February 2015	205 km/h (125 mph)	932 hPa (27.52 inHg)	Queensland, New South Wales	Unknown	Unknown	
Ernie	4–12 April 2017	220 km/h (140 mph)	924 hPa (27.29 inHg)	None	None	None	
Marcus	14–25 March 2018	250 km/h (155 mph)	905 hPa (26.72 inHg)	Northern Territory, Western Australia	Unknown	None	
Veronica	18–28 March 2019	215 km/h (130 mph)	928 hPa (27.40 inHg)	Western Australia			
Niran	27 February – 6 March 2021	205 km/h (125 mph)	936 hPa (27.64 inHg)	Queensland, New Caledonia	Unknown	Unknown	
Darian	13–30 December 2022	230 km/h (145 mph)	915 hPa (27.02 inHg)	None	None	None	
Herman	28 March – 5 April 2023	215 km/h (130 mph)	930 hPa (27.46 inHg)	None	None	None	
Ilsa	6–15 April 2023	230 km/h (145 mph)	915 hPa (27.02 inHg)	Indonesia, East Timor, Northern Territory, Western Australia	>$2.7 million	8	
Jasper	4–13 December 2023	215 km/h (130 mph)	926 hPa (27.34 inHg)	Queensland			
Olga	3–11 April 2024	205 km/h (125 mph)	933 hPa (27.55 inHg)	Western Australia	None	None	
Zelia	10–14 February 2025	215 km/h (130 mph)	927 hPa (27.37 inHg)	Western Australia	$733 million	None	
Courtney	22–29 March 2025	205 km/h (125 mph)	933 hPa (27.55 inHg)	None	None	None	
Errol	9–18 April 2025	205 km/h (125 mph)	936 hPa (27.64 inHg)	Indonesia, Western Australia	Minor	None	
Narelle	15–27 March 2026	215 km/h (130 mph)	931 hPa (27.49 inHg)	Queensland, Northern Territory, Western Australia	>$760,650	None	
Maila	1–10 April 2026	205 km/h (125 mph)	929 hPa (27.43 inHg)	Solomon Islands, Papua New Guinea	TBA	25+	

== Other systems ==
In addition to the 52 tropical cyclones listed above, three other tropical cyclones are considered by the BoM to have been a Category 5 severe tropical cyclone within the Australian region. These are Cyclone Mahina of 1899 and two tropical cyclones that struck Innisfail and Mackay during 1918. Severe tropical cyclones Erica (2003) and Harold (2020) became Category 5 severe tropical cyclones, after they moved out of the Australian region and into the South Pacific basin. Severe Tropical Cyclones Fran (1992) and Beni (2003) were Category 5 severe tropical cyclones, before they moved into the Australian region from the South Pacific basin. Severe Tropical Cyclone Ului weakened into a Category 4 severe tropical cyclone, as it moved across 160°E into the Australian region.

The BoM estimates that Severe Tropical cyclones Viola–Claudette (1979), Jane–Irna (1992), Daryl–Agnielle (1995), Bruce (2013) and Freddy (2023) peaked as Category 5 severe tropical cyclones, after they had moved out of the Australian region and into the South-West Indian Ocean.

Operationally Severe Tropical Cyclone Narelle (in 2013) was estimated to have peaked as a category 5 severe tropical cyclone, with 10-minute sustained winds of 205 km/h (125 mph). However, during the post-storm analysis process, it was downgraded to a Category 4 system, with 10-minute sustained winds of 195 km/h (120 mph).

== Impacts ==
Category 5 severe tropical cyclones are expected to cause widespread devastation if they significantly impact land.

== See also ==
- List of Category 5 Atlantic hurricanes
- List of Category 5 Pacific hurricanes
