= Cyclone Ita =

Category 5 Australian region cyclone in 2014

Severe Tropical Cyclone Ita
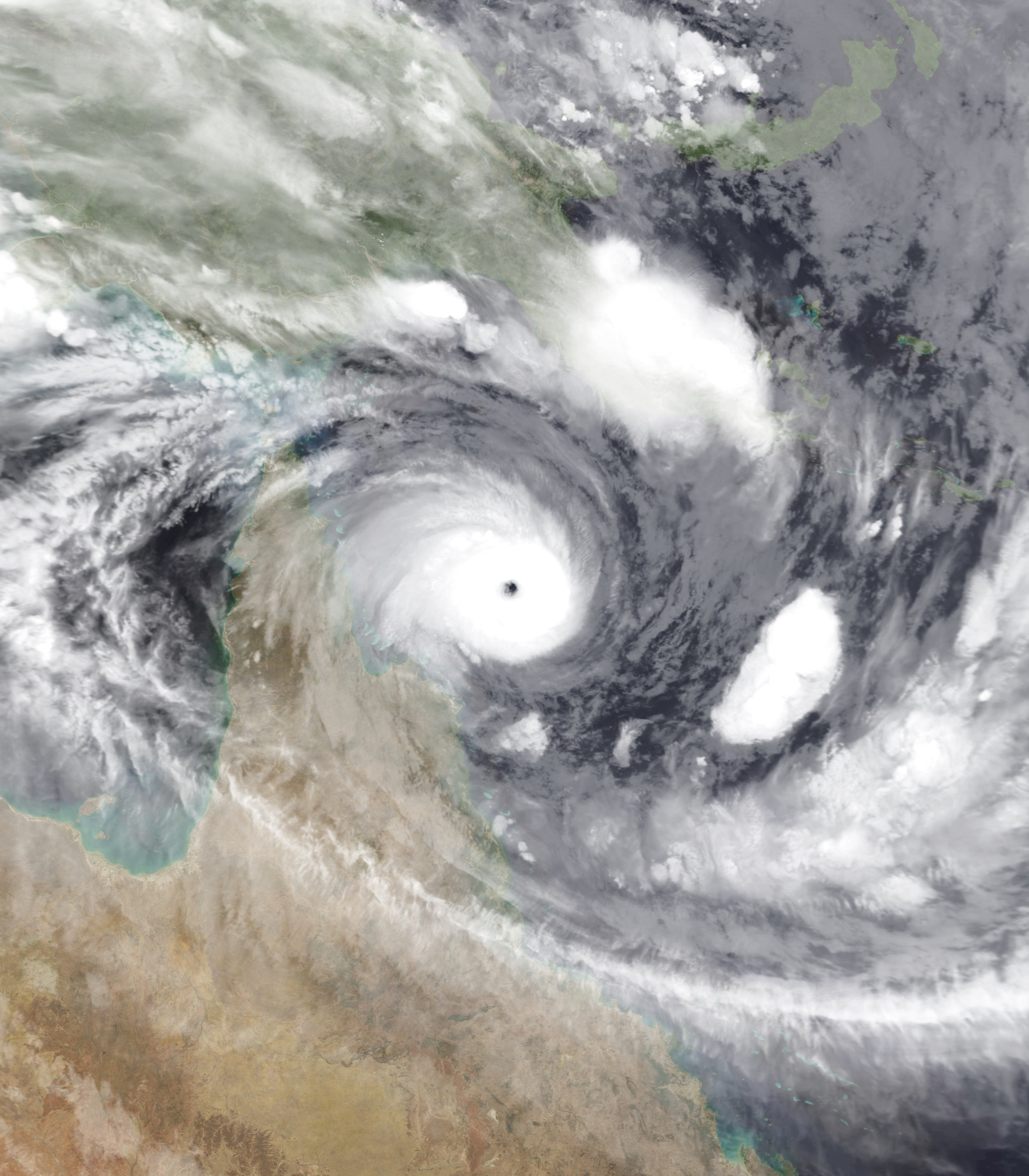
- Cyclone Ita at peak intensity while nearing Queensland on 11 April

Meteorological history
- Formed: 1 April 2014
- Extratropical: 14 April 2014
- Dissipated: 18 April 2014

Category 5 severe tropical cyclone
- 10-minute sustained (BOM)
- Highest winds: 220 km/h (140 mph)
- Highest gusts: 315 km/h (195 mph)
- Lowest pressure: 922 hPa (mbar); 27.23 inHg

Category 5-equivalent tropical cyclone
- 1-minute sustained (SSHWS/JTWC)
- Highest winds: 260 km/h (160 mph)
- Lowest pressure: 918 hPa (mbar); 27.11 inHg

Overall effects
- Fatalities: 40 total (Note: Total fatalities includes indirect deaths from a rotavirus outbreak related to the cyclone.)
- Damage: $1.15 billion
- Areas affected: Solomon Islands, Papua New Guinea, Queensland, New Zealand
- IBTrACS
- Part of the 2013–14 Australian region cyclone season

Severe Tropical Cyclone Ita was the strongest tropical cyclone in the Australian region by central pressure since George in 2007, and by wind speed since Monica in 2006. The system was first identified over the Solomon Islands as a tropical low on 1 April 2014, and gradually moved westward, eventually reaching cyclone intensity on 5 April. On 10 April, Ita intensified rapidly into a powerful Category 5 system on the Australian Scale, but it weakened to a Category 4 system in the hours immediately preceding landfall the following day. At the time of landfall at Cape Flattery at 12 April 22:00 (UTC+10), the cyclone's Dvorak intensity was approximately T5.0, consistent with a weak Category 4 system, and considerably lower than the T6.5 observed when the system was at its peak intensity. Meteorologists noted the system had, at that time, begun an eyewall replacement cycle; as a result, the system was considerably less powerful than various intensity scales had predicted. As a result, Ita's impact on terrain was lessened.

Owing to the rapid degradation of the cyclone before landfall, structural damage was relatively low at A$8.4 million (US$7.9 million). However, the agricultural industry suffered extensive impacts and total losses reached A$1.1 billion (US$1 billion).

== Meteorological history ==
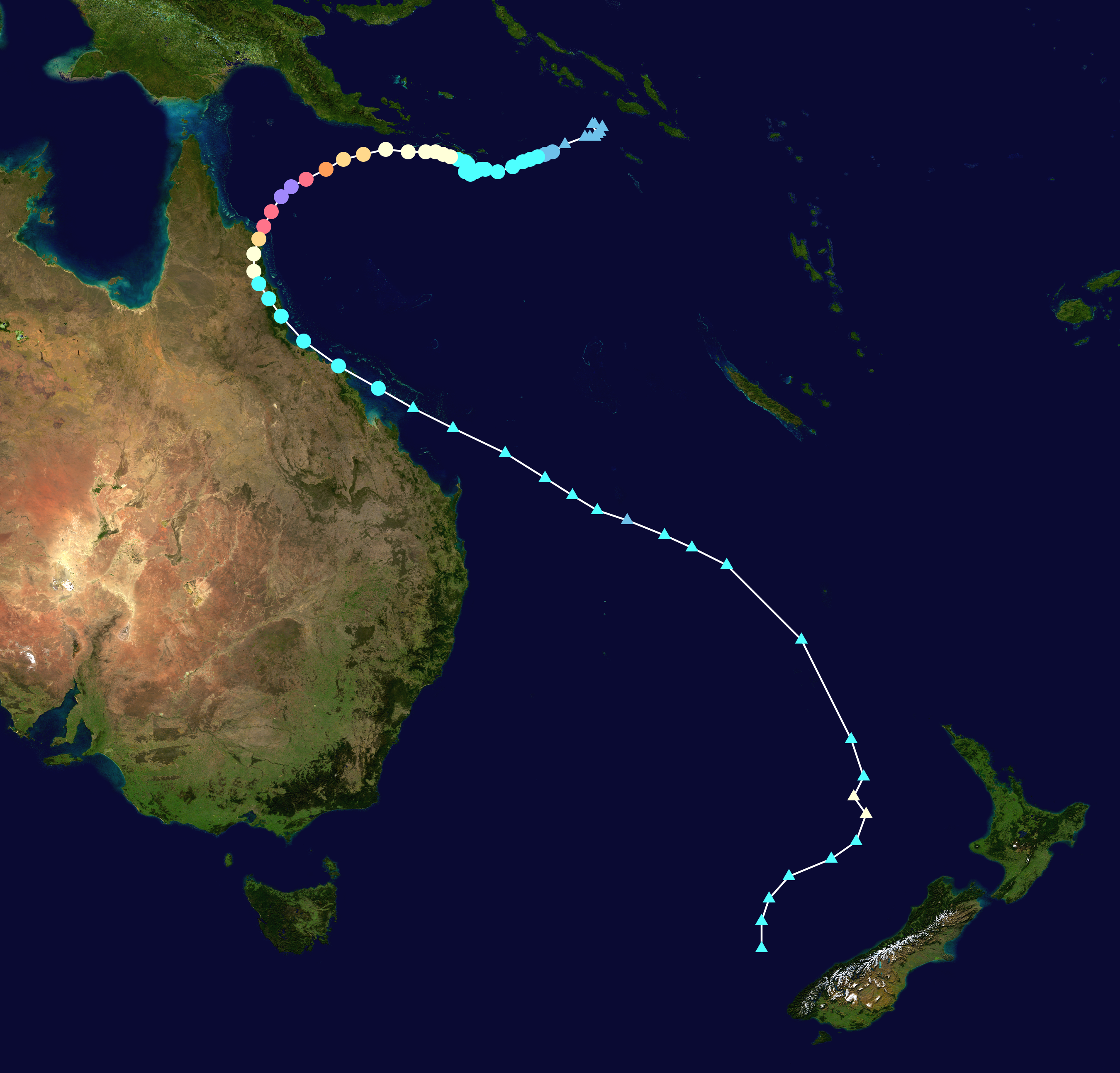
Map plotting the storm's track and intensity, according to the Saffir–Simpson scale Map key Saffir–Simpson scale Tropical depression (≤38 mph, ≤62 km/h) Tropical storm (39–73 mph, 63–118 km/h) Category 1 (74–95 mph, 119–153 km/h) Category 2 (96–110 mph, 154–177 km/h) Category 3 (111–129 mph, 178–208 km/h) Category 4 (130–156 mph, 209–251 km/h) Category 5 (≥157 mph, ≥252 km/h) Unknown Storm type Tropical cyclone Subtropical cyclone Extratropical cyclone, remnant low, tropical disturbance, or monsoon depression

On 1 April 2014, a broad, poorly defined area of low pressure consolidated over the Solomon Islands. Initially only accompanied by flaring convection, the system persisted in a region of low wind shear and strong outflow which promoted gradual development. Upon formation, the Bureau of Meteorology (BoM) office in Brisbane monitored the system as a tropical low. Banding features gradually developed and wrapped around the circulation and deep convection became persistent by 2 April. A large central dense overcast developed over the low early on 3 April, prompting the Joint Typhoon Warning Center (JTWC) to issue a Tropical Cyclone Formation Alert.

After moving away from Papua New Guinea, Ita underwent explosive intensification and attained its peak intensity as a Category 5 severe tropical cyclone early on 11 April. Winds were estimated to have reached 220 km/h (140 mph) alongside a minimum central pressure of 922 mbar (hPa; 27.23 inHg). Turning to the south-southeast, the storm weakened somewhat before making landfall near Cape Flattery as a Category 4 later on 11 April. An automated weather station on Lizard Island, roughly 5 km (3.1 mi) from the storm's centre, recorded a pressure of 954 mbar (hPa; 28.17 inHg). Once onshore Ita weakened dramatically to a Category 1 within 18 hours. Maintaining gale-force winds the storm turned southwest and accelerated, eventually moving offshore north of Mackay on 13 April. The following day Ita transitioned into an extratropical cyclone as it moved away from Australia and towards New Zealand. Ita's extratropical remnants combined with a low pressure system to the south and re-intensified. On 17 April, the low-level circulation center of the storm collapsed, as Ita affected New Zealand, bringing heavy rainfall and powerful winds. On 18 April, Ita's remnants curved to the west and the south, before dissipating offshore of New Zealand later on the same day.

== Preparations and impact ==
=== Solomon Islands ===
Deaths and damage by country
Country	Total deaths	Total damages (US$)
Australia	0	$1 billion
New Zealand	0	$42.9 million
Papua New Guinea	0	—N/a
Solomon Islands	40	$107.8 million
Sources cited in text.

As the precursor tropical low to Cyclone Ita affected the Solomon Islands, local authorities issued heavy flood warnings, tropical disturbance and cyclone watches.

Nearly two days of continuous heavy rains from the storm caused flash flooding in the Solomon Islands. Over a four-day span, more than 1,000 mm (39 in) fell at the Gold Ridge mine in Guadalcanal, with 500 mm (20 in) falling in a 24‑hour span. The Matanikau River, which runs through the capital city Honiara, broke its banks on 3 April and devastated nearby communities. Thousands of homes along with the city's two main bridges were washed away, stranding numerous residents. The national hospital had to evacuate 500 patients to other facilities due to flooding. Graham Kenna from Save the Children stated that, "the scale of destruction is like something never seen before in the Solomon Islands." According to Permanent Secretary Melchoir Mataki, the majority of homes destroyed in Honiara were built on a flood plain where construction was not allowed.

Severe flooding took place on Guadalcanal.

Throughout the Solomon Islands, 22 people were killed while an estimated 50,000 people were affected by the floods. Approximately 9,000 were left homeless. Total economic losses from the disaster were tremendous, amounting to SI$787.3 million (US$107.8 million) or roughly 9.2 percent of the country's gross domestic product.

=== Papua New Guinea ===
Animated infrared satellite loop of Cyclone Ita on 8 April developing off the southeast coast of Papua New Guinea.

Ahead of Ita affecting Papua New Guinea, the National Weather Service issued tropical cyclone warnings for all island and coastal communities in Milne Bay Province. The NWS also urged people in the East and West New Britain provinces, New Ireland and Bougainville, the southeast sector of the Solomon Sea and North Coral Sea areas to take precautions. All schools and businesses were closed for several days in Milne Bay while residents were urged to remain indoors.

The storm brought unusually heavy rains and strong winds to Milne Bay Province and the National Capital District. The hardest hit areas were the islands of Rossell, Misima, Samarai, Woodlark, Sau, and Vanatinai. Unconfirmed reports of casualties were received from these areas. On Ware Island, 54 homes and 1 classroom were destroyed. Along the mainland, Alotau experienced strong winds that downed trees and power lines, leaving many without power, and flooding that destroyed homes. Throughout Milne Bay, an estimated 62,000 people were affected by the storm. Some flooding was reported in Port Moresby. Further north in Jiwaka Province, the a bridge along the Highlands Highway crossing the Tuman River was washed away. Officials in Milne Bay Province stated that 1,159 homes were destroyed by the storm; however, local authorities claimed thousands more collapsed.

=== Australia ===
Costliest Australian region tropical cyclones
Rank	Tropical cyclones	Season	Damage
1	4 Yasi	2010–11	$3.6 billion
2	4 Debbie	2016–17	$2.73 billion
3	TS Oswald	2012–13	$2.52 billion
4	4 Alfred	2024–25	$1.36 billion
5	4 Veronica	2018–19	$1.2 billion
6	5 Ita	2013–14	$1.15 billion
7	4 Larry	2005–06	$1.1 billion
8	4 Zelia	2024–25	$733 million
9	4 Jasper	2023–24	$670 million
10	3 Tracy	1974–75	$645 million

Ahead of the cyclone affecting Cape York, the Bureau of Meteorology issued a cyclone watch on 9 April, for the far northern Queensland coast between Cape Grenville and Port Douglas. The Bureau predicted it to reach category five and would be the most severe storm to affect Queensland since Cyclone Yasi in 2011. On 10 April, Cyclone Ita was upgraded to category five, with a cyclone warning issued for the far northern Queensland coast between Lockhart River and Cairns. In anticipation of the Cyclone, tourists and staff were evacuated from a holiday resort on Lizard Island on 10 April. As Ita neared landfall, all residents in Cooktown and Hopevale were advised to evacuate either to a community cyclone shelter or to leave the towns.

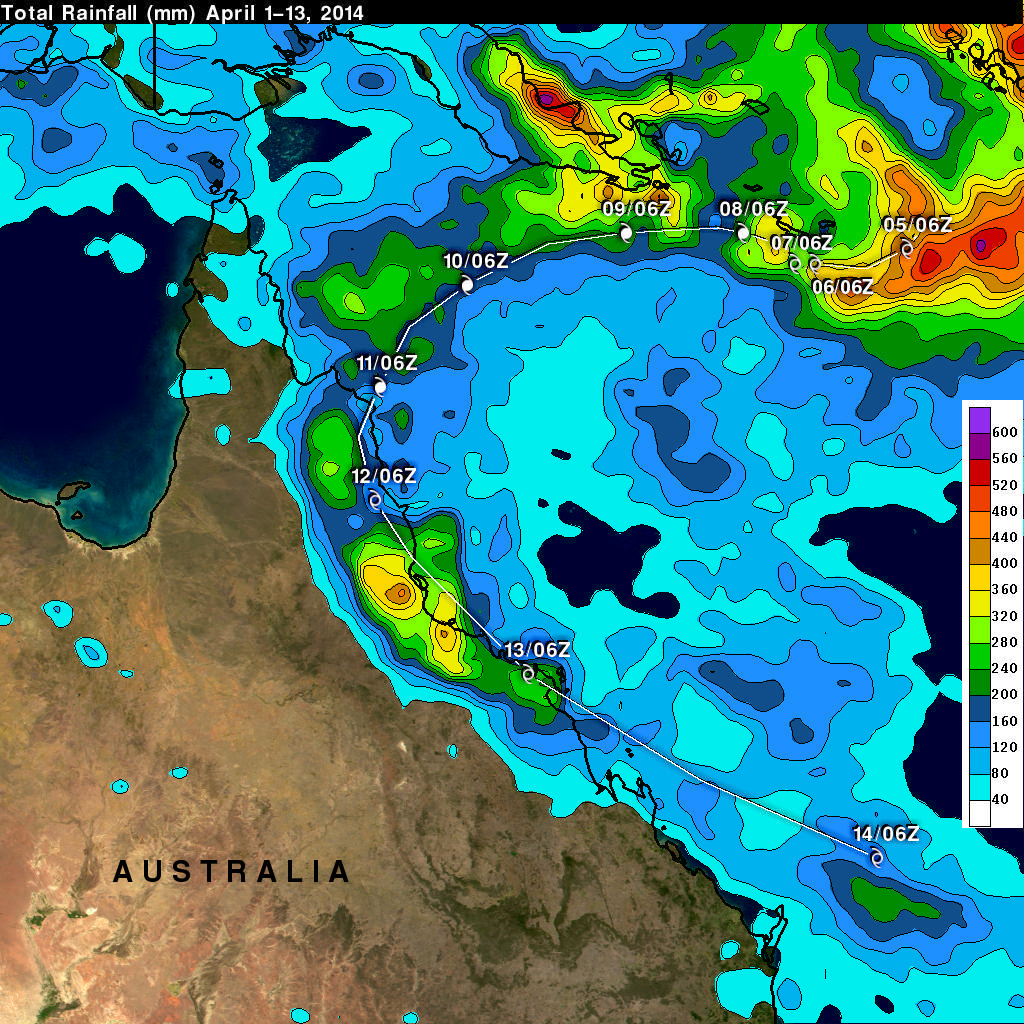
Satellite estimated rainfall map from 1–13 April showing accumulations throughout Ita's path. The highest amounts, 560 to 600 mm (22 to 24 in), fell just off the coast of Papua New Guinea and over the Coral Sea. The heaviest rains in Australia were confined to areas west of Ingham and Townsville.

Though a weakened storm at landfall, Ita brought damaging winds to coastal areas around Cape Flattery where gusts peaked at 160 km/h (99 mph). An automated weather station on Lizard Island recorded gusts up to 155 km/h (96 mph) before the anemometer failed. Cooktown, the closest populated area to where the storm moved ashore, experienced winds up to 125 km/h (78 mph). Gale-force winds affected areas as far south as the Northumberland Islands, with Mackay recording gusts up to 94 km/h (58 mph). A minor storm surge accompanied the cyclone; however, it coincided with low-tide and had limited effects. Minor flora damage was reported at Mackay, in the heart of city the top of a palm tree was blown off by the high winds. In Shoal Point minor damage was reported with some branches fell with one damaging a fence.

The greatest impact from Ita resulted from heavy rains, with many areas receiving up to 300 mm (12 in) in 24 hours. Cardwell reported an April record 307.0 mm (12.09 in) of rain in 24 hours, while in Tully 312.0 mm (12.28 in) of rain fell over two days, causing moderate flooding in both towns. In Bowen, 110 mm (4.3 in) fell in one-hour, triggering a flash flood through the towns main street. Cooktown received 197.8 mm (7.79 in) of rain over a three-day span. The Daintree, Mulgrave, Haughton, and Herbert rivers all experienced major flooding. Townsville reported 214.2 mm (8.43 in) of rain and wind gusts of up to 93 km/h (58 mph) causing only minor damage. The outer bands of the Ita caused heavy rain and storms as far south as the Wide Bay–Burnett region as it tracked back out to sea again, Kingaroy recorded 50.4 mm (1.98 in) in less than an hour from a severe thunderstorm, while The Town of 1770 received 81.6 mm (3.21 in).

Cooktown experienced the greatest structural damage from winds, with 200 homes affected, of which 16 were severely damaged or destroyed. Many buildings, including a 140‑year‑old hotel in the town centre, lost their roof. Power was cut to the whole town and many trees were uprooted and destroyed; however, no injuries were reported as the majority of the towns residents were safe in the towns community cyclone shelter.

Heavy rain caused moderate flooding throughout most of North Queensland, five people were rescued from floodwaters between Cooktown and Cairns and flooding in the Daintree River threatened several properties in Mossman, while further south a few low-lying houses were inundated in Ingham. Several houses were also flooded from a minor storm surge in Cairns, however damage was limited.

Total economic damage from Cyclone Ita amounted to A$1.1 billion (US$1 billion). The greatest losses took place in the agricultural sector, with a 700 km (430 mi) stretch of sugarcane country suffering damage. Roughly 80 percent of the sugarcane crop in the Herbert River District was destroyed with the remaining crops damaged. Insurance companies initially estimated that claims could match those from Cyclone Oswald in 2013; however, insured losses only reached A$8.4 million (US$7.9 million).

=== New Zealand ===
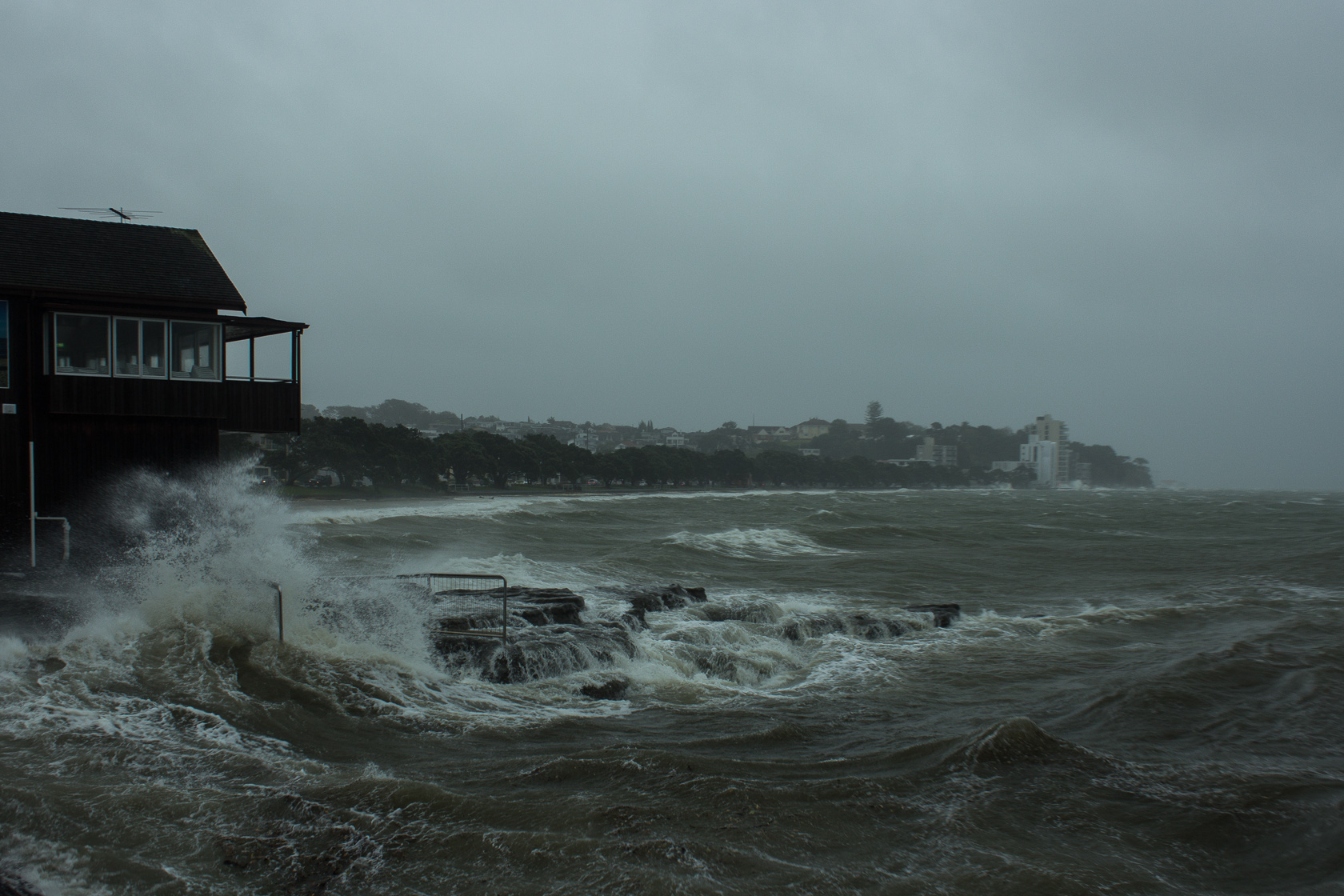
Storm surge from the remnants of Ita in Auckland near Tamaki Drive

The remnants of Ita brought heavy rains and strong winds to much of New Zealand on 17 April. Winds, peaking at 130 km/h (81 mph) in Westport, downed many trees and power lines. Much of the country experienced gale-force winds, though the North Island and northwestern areas of the South Island bore the brunt of the storm. Numerous cars were rolled by the winds, including one which was blown off a bridge over the Haast River. Buses transporting workers from the Stockton Mine were also knocked over. Much of Westport was isolated by downed trees and the whole Buller District was left without electricity when the transmission lines were damaged. In Auckland, tidal and flash flooding closed several roads and trapped residents. Gusts on the Auckland Harbour Bridge peaked at 100 km/h (62 mph). Throughout Auckland, at least 15,000 people were without power.

Entire hillsides reportedly collapsed in rural areas of Clarence and Ward. Agricultural damage in parts of the South Island were compared to Cyclone Bola in 1988, a storm regarded as one of the worst to ever strike New Zealand. Throughout the Grey District, 39 homes were rendered uninhabitable while at least 60 other structures sustained varying degrees of damage. Losses in the district were estimated to be in excess of NZ$20 million (US$17.1 million). Throughout New Zealand, insured losses amounted to NZ$55.3 million (US$42.9 million).

== Aftermath ==
In November 2014, the name Ita was retired from the list of names in the Australian basin and replaced with Ivana. In a situation unusual for a cyclone name, a second unused name on the pre-2014 list, Ira, would also be replaced at the same time by Irving due to similar spelling and pronunciation. Irving would ultimately be used for the first time in the 2017-18 season.

=== Solomon Islands ===
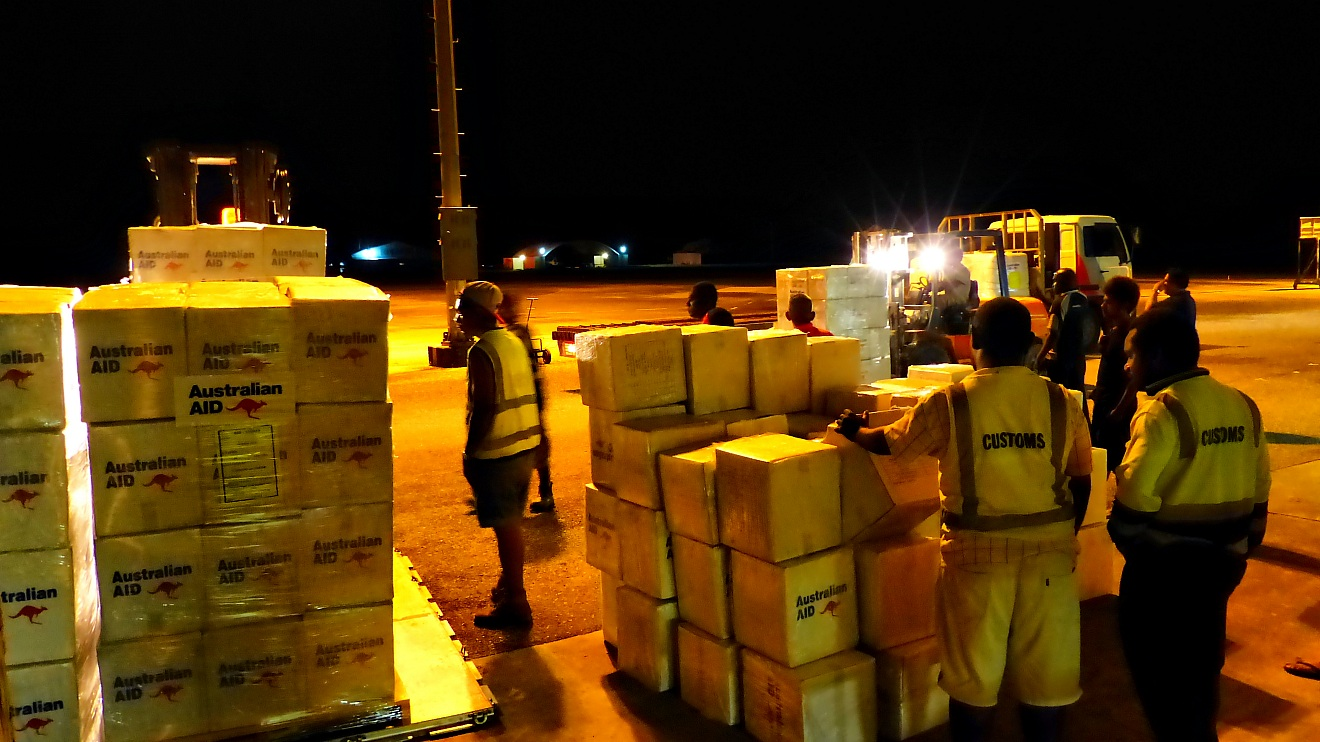
Relief supplies from the Australian Department of Foreign Affairs and Trade

Soon after the floods, Honiara and Guadalcanal were declared disaster areas by the Solomon Government. Debris left behind by the floods initially hampered relief efforts, with the runway at Honiara International Airport blocked by two destroyed homes. Food supplies started running low as the Red Cross provided aid to the thousands homeless. The airport was reopened on 6 April, allowing for supplies from Australia and New Zealand to be delivered. Roughly 20 percent of Honiara population relocated to evacuation centers as entire communities were swept away.

New Zealand offered an immediate NZ$300,000 in funds and deployed a C-130 Hercules with supplies and emergency response personnel. Australia donated A$250,000 on 6 April and sent engineers and response teams to aid in relief efforts. On 8 April, Australia increased its aid package to A$3 million while New Zealand provided an additional NZ$1.2 million. Papua New Guinea and Taiwan provided PGK 1 million and US$200,000 in funds, respectively.

In the immediate aftermath of the floods, there were fears that the flooding could worsen an already ongoing dengue fever outbreak and cause outbreaks of diarrhea and conjunctivitis. Over the following two months, a widespread rotavirus outbreak unfolded in Honiara, Guadalcanal, and Gizo, with more than 1,000 people falling ill. Severe cases of diarrhea became common among children, with 18 dying as a result in early June. By mid-July, the outbreak was fully contained with no further cases of the disease. Additionally, 24 people contracted leprosy in Honiara within a shelter.

=== Papua New Guinea ===
On 15 April, Papua New Guinea Prime Minister Peter O'Neill and Speaker of Parliament Theo Zurenuoc provided PGK300,000 (US$113,700) in funds to Milne Bay Province. The Papua New Guinea Defence Force was dispatched to deliver relief supplies to the region. Damage surveys were conducted simultaneously using the Defense Force's helicopters to determine the areas in need of the most immediate aid. Ten relief teams were dispatched on 16 April to assist with clean up efforts. The nation's health office also warned of the dangers of post-storm diseases due to damaged sewer systems. Communications with the outermost islands of the province remained difficult and limited to short-distance radio. By 17 April, a barge with 57 bales of rice was sent to Wari island where thousands of residents were in need of food.

=== Australia ===
Owing to the severity of agricultural damage, the average cost of avocados, bananas, iceberg lettuce, and papayas increased.

== See also ==
- Cyclone Guba – a similarly slow moving storm in 2007 that caused deadly flooding in Papua New Guinea
- Cyclone Yasi – a Category 5 severe tropical cyclone that affected Queensland in 2011
- Cyclone Lusi – a storm a month prior to Ita that also caused extensive damage as an extratropical cyclone in New Zealand
- Cyclone Bola – Regarded as one of the worst former tropical cyclones to have impacted New Zealand
- Cyclone Rewa – Long-lived storm that affected similar areas
- Cyclone Ului – Similar storm to Cyclone Yasi, but occurred a year before it
- List of Queensland tropical cyclones
