= Cyclone Zelia =

Category 5 Australian region cyclone in 2025

Severe Tropical Cyclone Zelia
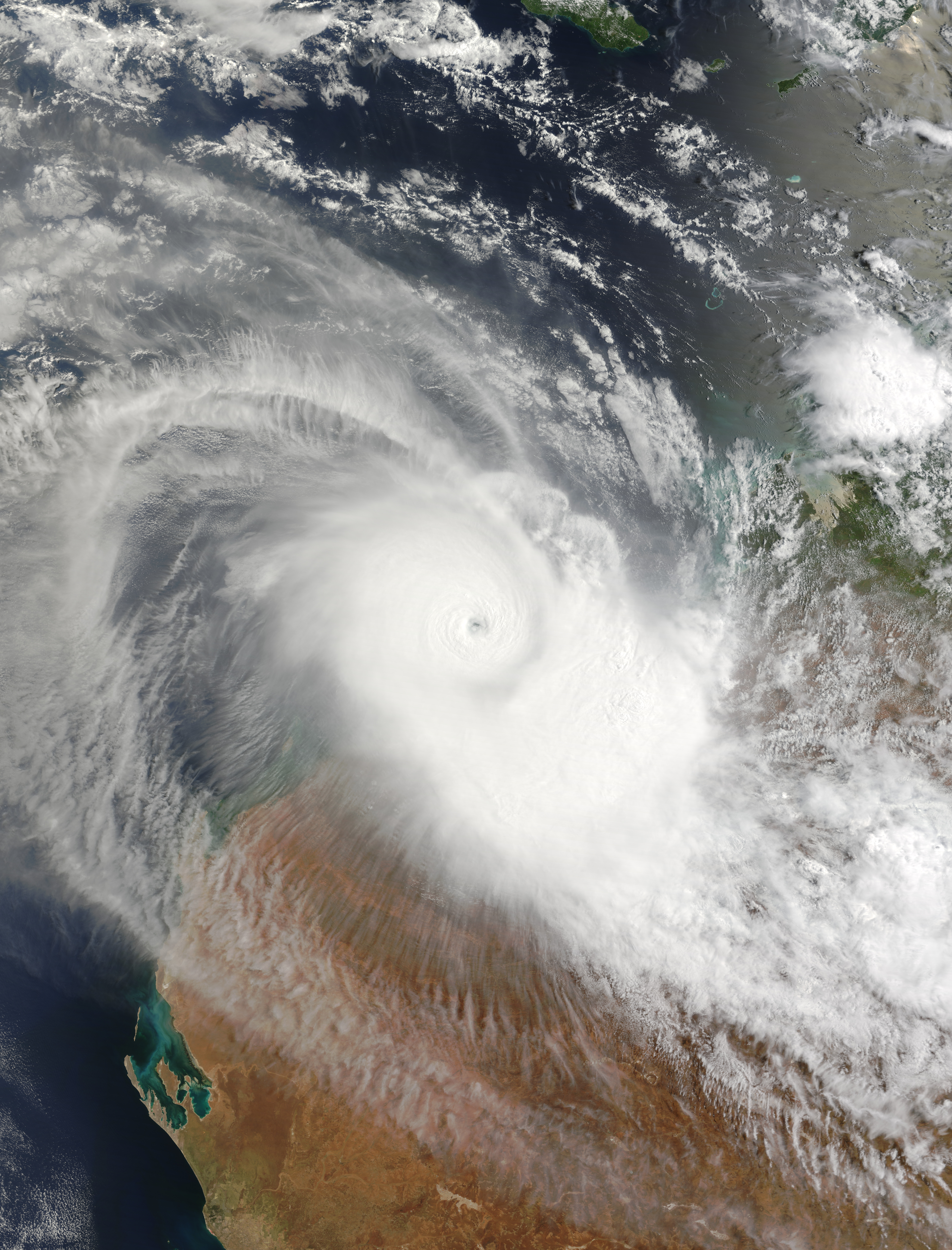
- Zelia near its peak intensity on 13 February

Meteorological history
- Formed: 8 February 2025
- Dissipated: 14 February 2025

Category 5 severe tropical cyclone
- 10-minute sustained (BOM)
- Highest winds: 215 km/h (130 mph)
- Lowest pressure: 927 hPa (mbar); 27.37 inHg

Category 4-equivalent tropical cyclone
- 1-minute sustained (SSHWS/JTWC)
- Highest winds: 240 km/h (150 mph)
- Lowest pressure: 923 hPa (mbar); 27.26 inHg

Overall effects
- Fatalities: None
- Damage: $733 million (2025 USD)
- Areas affected: Western Australia (particularly Kimberley and Pilbara)
- IBTrACS
- Part of the 2024–25 Australian region cyclone season

Severe Tropical Cyclone Zelia was a powerful tropical cyclone that impacted Western Australia's Pilbara region in mid-February 2025. The fifteenth tropical low, fifth tropical cyclone, fourth severe tropical cyclone, and first Category 5 tropical cyclone of the 2024–25 Australian region cyclone season, Zelia originated as a tropical low near the Kimberley region of Western Australia. The tropical low began to organize while slowly moving westward and was later upgraded to Cyclone Zelia. Zelia turned to the southwest and began to rapidly intensify. The cyclone then peaked with 1-minute maximum sustained winds of 130 kn (240 km/h; 150 mph). Zelia then began to gradually weaken while turning southeast toward the coast of Western Australia and made landfall with 10-minute maximum sustained winds of 95 kn (175 km/h; 110 mph). As Zelia continued to track inland, it rapidly weakened to a tropical low and dissipated.

Zelia caused major damage. Several areas were flooded and strong winds damaged multiple structures. Economic losses totaled to US$733 million. Despite the severity of the damage, no deaths were reported.

== Meteorological history ==
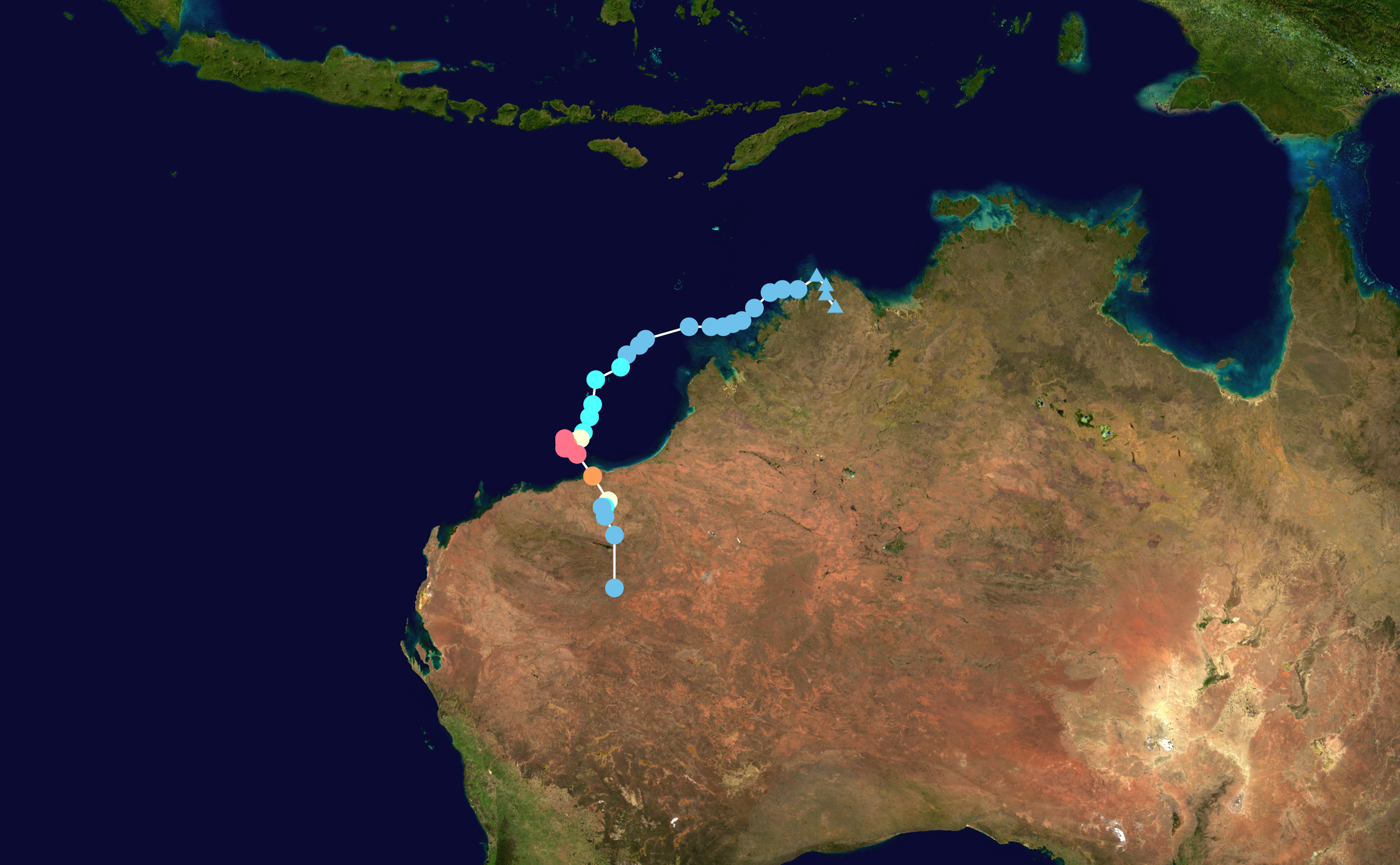
Map plotting the storm's track and intensity, according to the Saffir–Simpson scale Map key Saffir–Simpson scale Tropical depression (≤38 mph, ≤62 km/h) Tropical storm (39–73 mph, 63–118 km/h) Category 1 (74–95 mph, 119–153 km/h) Category 2 (96–110 mph, 154–177 km/h) Category 3 (111–129 mph, 178–208 km/h) Category 4 (130–156 mph, 209–251 km/h) Category 5 (≥157 mph, ≥252 km/h) Unknown Storm type Tropical cyclone Subtropical cyclone Extratropical cyclone, remnant low, tropical disturbance, or monsoon depression

Late on 7 February, the United States Joint Typhoon Warning Center (JTWC) reported that an area of convection, pre-designated by the Australian Bureau of Meteorology (BoM) as 18U, had persisted approximately 151 nmi (280 km; 174 mi) to the northwest of Wyndham, Australia, within a monsoon trough that set the latest onset of the wet season in the northern part of the country. At the time, the system had a broad and weakly-defined centre, and was under a favorable environment of 30–31 °C (86–88 °F) sea surface temperatures, low to moderate vertical wind shear, and good outflow aloft. Over the next few days, it slowly organized as it moved generally southwest, with convection building near 18U's broad centre. By 03:00 UTC on 11 February, the JTWC issued a Tropical Cyclone Formation Alert as observations from Port Hedland indicated the system's pressure deepening. Six hours later, the JTWC upgraded the system into a tropical storm, designating it as 17S, after an ASCAT pass and observations from Rowley Shoals indicated gale-force winds near the system. The BoM would later follow suit 12 hours later as gale-force winds wrapped all around the system, naming the system as Zelia.

As it became slow moving due to being situated in a col, Zelia went in an period of extreme rapid intensification, fueled by lowering shear and increased upper divergence; the system reached Category 2 tropical cyclone intensity at 00:00 UTC on 12 February, with the JTWC upgrading the system to a Category 1-equivalent tropical cyclone in the Saffir–Simpson scale six hours later. By 12:00 UTC, Zelia became a Category 3 severe tropical cyclone, before the BoM further upgraded the system to a Category 4 severe cyclone late on the same day. By 13 February, Zelia had reached Category 5 severe tropical cyclone status, with the JTWC classifying the system as a Category 4-equivalent cyclone as it developed a 10 nmi (12 mi; 19 km) eye. The storm then went into an eyewall replacement cycle; however, it didn't complete the process, and instead re-intensified to reach its peak intensity at 12:00 UTC that same day according to both agencies, with 10-minute sustained winds of 115 kn (215 km/h; 130 mph) and 1-minute sustained winds of 130 kn (240 km/h; 150 mph), respectively.

Zelia making landfall in Western Australia on 14 February

Turning to the southeast, Zelia began to weaken once again due to an slight increase of wind shear, and by the next day, the BoM had downgraded the system to a Category 3 severe tropical cyclone. At 04:00 UTC (12:00 p.m AWST), it made landfall near the De Grey River in Western Australia, with 10-minute sustained winds of 95 kn (175 km/h; 110 mph) and a central pressure of 935 hPa (27.6 inHg). After landfall, the JTWC issued their final warning on Zelia, while the BoM continued to track the system until late on the same day, as it rapidly weakened to a tropical low.

== Preparations and impact ==
=== Western Australia ===
Costliest Australian region tropical cyclones
Rank	Tropical cyclones	Season	Damage
1	4 Yasi	2010–11	$3.6 billion
2	4 Debbie	2016–17	$2.73 billion
3	TS Oswald	2012–13	$2.52 billion
4	4 Alfred	2024–25	$1.36 billion
5	4 Veronica	2018–19	$1.2 billion
6	5 Ita	2013–14	$1.15 billion
7	4 Larry	2005–06	$1.1 billion
8	4 Zelia	2024–25	$733 million
9	4 Jasper	2023–24	$670 million
10	3 Tracy	1974–75	$645 million

In the state, more than a dozen schools were closed. Two evacuation centers would be opened due to the storm. Multiple highways were closed, while trade in the ports of Dampier and Varanus Island was postponed. A cyclone emergency warning was issued from Pardoo Roadhouse to Whim Creek. Dozens of people were being evacuated from remote communities, with helicopters having airlifted 63 people from Warralong, 120km south-east of Port Hedland. 13 people from Gooda Binya community self-evacuated overnight to a civic centre at Marble Bar. A major flood warning was issued for the De Grey River catchment, including nearby towns.

Zelia made landfall near De Grey River, northeast of Port Hedland, causing $733 million USD damage worth of economic losses in the Pilbara and Kimberley regions, specifically causing damage in Port Hedland. Rainfall and flooding caused major impacts, especially at De Gray and Pardoo stations, receiving over 500mm of total rainfall lasing 3 days. The cyclone brought heavy rain and damaging winds near Port Hedland, causing flash flooding, prompting evacuation in the Gooda Binya and Warralong communities during the floods. The storm caused significant damage to houses, powerlines and disrupted road access. Zelia also prompted closures of ports at Port Hedland, Cape Lambert and Dampier for three days, disrupting shipping and offshore oil and gas operations resulted in major economic costs to industry.

== Retirement ==
Due to the high amount of damage, the name Zelia was retired and will never be used for another tropical cyclone. It was replaced by Zhu for future seasons.

== See also ==
- Tropical cyclones in 2025
- Weather of 2025
- List of Category 5 Australian region severe tropical cyclones
- Cyclone Orson (1989) – took a similar path after landfall
- Cyclone George (2007) – took a similar path at a similar intensity
- Cyclone Veronica (2019) – took a similar path
- Cyclone Ilsa (2023) – impacted the same areas
