= Cyclone Chris =

Category 5 Australian region cyclone in 2002

Severe Tropical Cyclone Chris
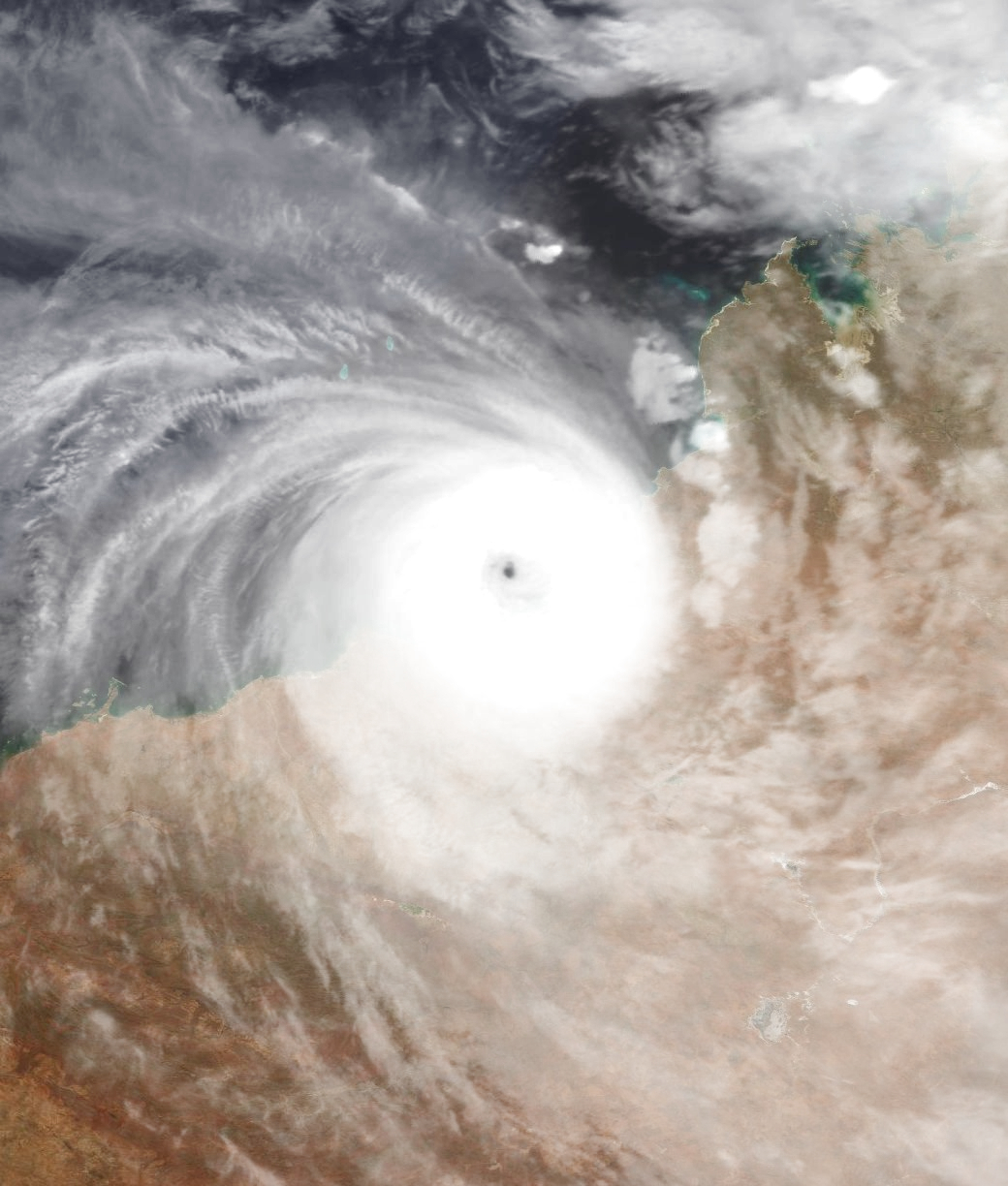
- Satellite image of Cyclone Chris near peak intensity

Meteorological history
- Formed: 2 February 2002
- Dissipated: 6 February 2002

Category 5 severe tropical cyclone
- 10-minute sustained (BOM)
- Highest winds: 205 km/h (125 mph)
- Highest gusts: 285 km/h (180 mph)
- Lowest pressure: 915 hPa (mbar); 27.02 inHg

Category 4-equivalent tropical cyclone
- 1-minute sustained (SSHWS/JTWC)
- Highest winds: 230 km/h (145 mph)
- Lowest pressure: 916 hPa (mbar); 27.05 inHg

Overall effects
- Missing: 12
- Damage: $929,000 (2002 USD)
- Areas affected: Indonesia and Western Australia
- IBTrACS
- Part of the 2001–02 Australian region cyclone season

Severe Tropical Cyclone Chris was one of the most powerful cyclones to strike Western Australia on record, packing winds gusting up to 290 km/h (180 mph).

== Meteorological history ==
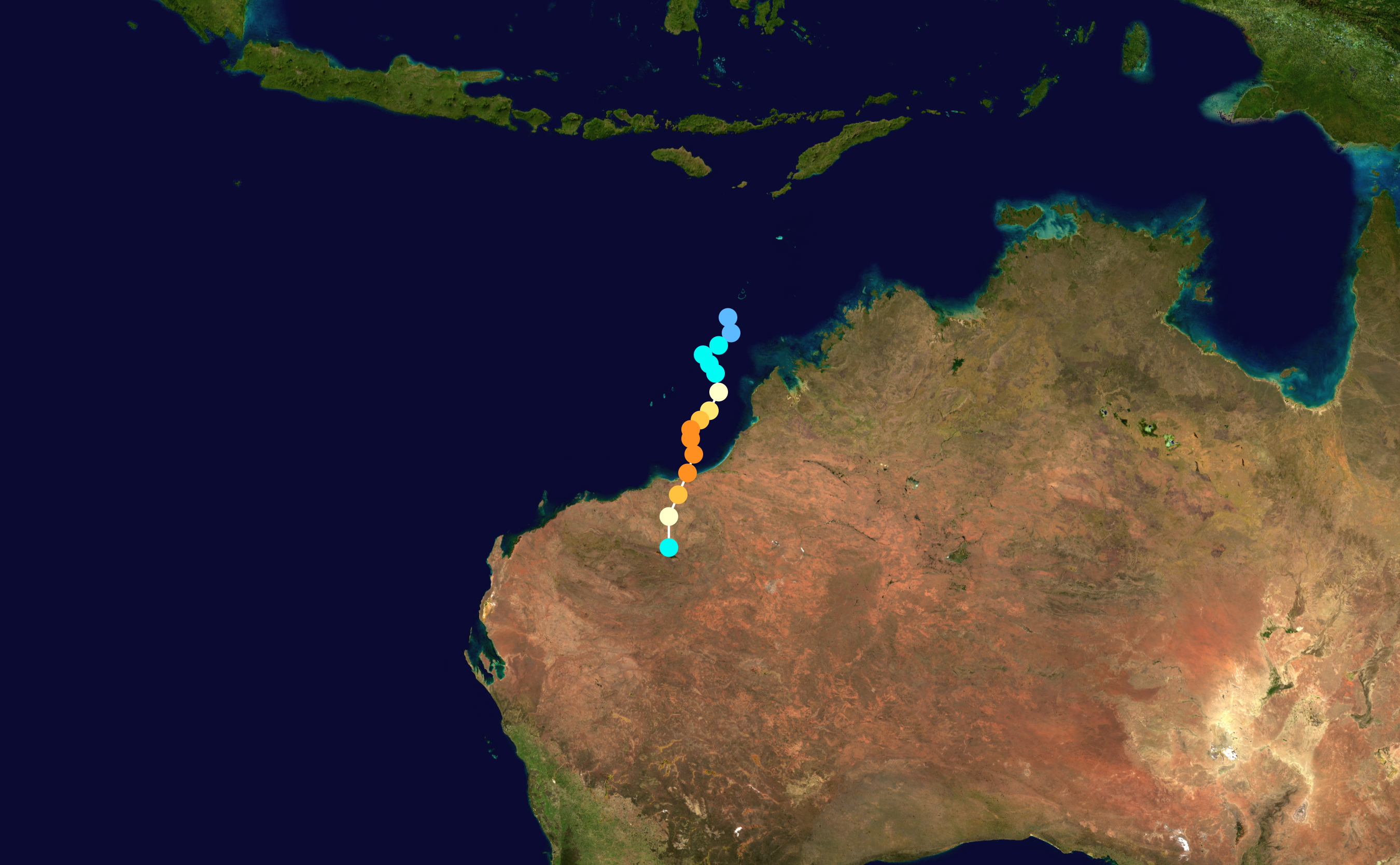
Map plotting the storm's track and intensity, according to the Saffir–Simpson scale Map key Saffir–Simpson scale Tropical depression (≤38 mph, ≤62 km/h) Tropical storm (39–73 mph, 63–118 km/h) Category 1 (74–95 mph, 119–153 km/h) Category 2 (96–110 mph, 154–177 km/h) Category 3 (111–129 mph, 178–208 km/h) Category 4 (130–156 mph, 209–251 km/h) Category 5 (≥157 mph, ≥252 km/h) Unknown Storm type Tropical cyclone Subtropical cyclone Extratropical cyclone, remnant low, tropical disturbance, or monsoon depression

Severe Tropical Cyclone Chris was first identified by the Australian Bureau of Meteorology (BoM) on 1 February 2002 as a weak area of low pressure over the Timor Sea. Over the following day, the system tracked towards the southwest, eventually reaching a point roughly 340 km (210 mi) northwest of Broome, Western Australia, at which time it was classified as a tropical low. Situated in a region of moderate wind shear and good upper-level divergence, the system gradually intensified. The low initially tracked towards the southeast in response to a monsoonal flow; however, this later shifted towards the south-southwest as system intensified. On 2 February, the low intensified into a minimal tropical cyclone. Operationally, the system was not classified as a tropical cyclone until 3 February, at which time it was given the name Chris by the BoM. Although already considered to have obtained gale-force winds by the BoM, the Joint Typhoon Warning Center (JTWC) assessed the system to have become a tropical depression late on 2 February.

Chris reached peak intensity with 1-minute sustained winds of 230 kilometres per hour (140 mph) as it approached the coast late on 5 February. The storm made landfall early on 6 February near peak intensity, between Pardoo Station and Wallal, Western Australia.

== Preparations and impact ==
Off the coast of Indonesia, two motorboats capsized amid turbulent waters. The twelve people on these boats were listed as missing. Naval vessels from Indonesia were deployed to search for the missing people on 7 February. Heavy rains throughout southern Indonesia triggered flooding and mudslides in numerous towns and villages. Some areas were inundated by up to 4 m (13 ft) of water as a result of the storm. Significant coastal damage was also reported from large swells.

Ahead of the storm, residents throughout the Pilbara region were placed on high alert as the Category 5 cyclone neared landfall. By 5 February, towns from Bidyadanga to Port Hedland and inland to Marble Bar were placed on yellow alert. The city of Port Hedland (pop. 14,000) was one of the larger population centres in the path of Chris. Throughout the threatened region, workers were sent home early to be with their families and make final preparations for the storm. All businesses were closed and roads were likely to be shut down across the area.

In Western Australia, Chris resulted in large losses of cattle herds. One farmer reported that roughly 20% of the 6,000 cattle he owned died during the storm. Losses from the cattle were estimated at A$1 million (US$929,000). In aboriginal communities along the coast, emergency assessment teams discovered that a 500,000 acre cattle farm was completely wiped out. In remote communities in the Pilbara region, heavy rains, exceeding 100 mm (3.9 in) in several locations, triggered flooding. Residents in the Warralong community were forced to evacuate their homes after the local creek flooded. However, as rescue crews attempted to reach those still in the town, it was found to be completely isolated by flood waters.

At the town of Bonney Downs, along the Nullagine River, 309 mm (12.2 in) of rain produced by the storm caused the river to burst its banks, inundating parts of Nullagine, Western Australia. Significant structural damage was reported in Pardoo where the town's makeshift shelter lost its roof and some of its walls; a shed was destroyed and several homes were damaged. Several buildings in the town were destroyed by the floods, including a preschool. Power lines throughout the area were downed. At the height of the storm, communications were lost with Marble Bar. Throughout the town, only one home sustained roof damage and several fences were knocked over.

By 7 February, emergency crews were deployed to the region to assist the local Aboriginal community. In some areas, rain produced by Cyclone Chris was seen in a positive way as the region was experiencing a prolonged drought, with a few places not receiving any rain within the previous 12 months.

As a result of its damage, the name Chris was retired subsequent to its usage; its name was replaced with Clancy.

=== Historical perspective ===
As Cyclone Chris neared the Western Australian coastline, national media noted the storm's extreme intensity and compared it to several of Australia's worst cyclones. It was noted that Chris was more intense than the country's costliest natural disaster, Cyclone Tracy in 1974; almost as strong as the most intense to strike the region Cyclone Vance in 1999; and similar to that of Cyclone Annette in 1994 which killed thousands of cattle in Western Australia.

== See also ==
- List of Category 5 Australian region severe tropical cyclones
- List of Western Australia tropical cyclones
