= Cyclone Alfred =

Category 4 Australian region cyclone in 2025

Severe Tropical Cyclone Alfred
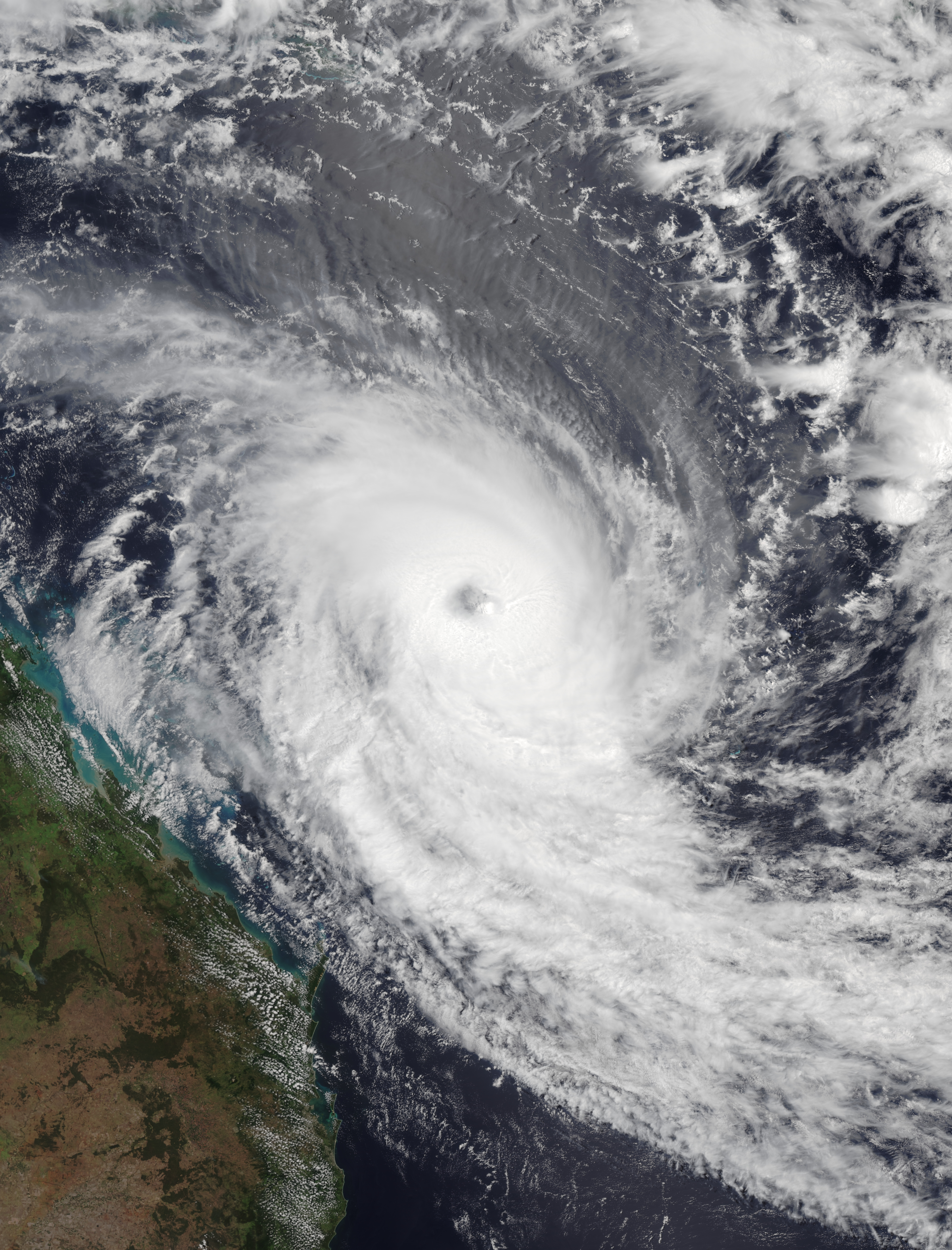
- Cyclone Alfred at its secondary peak intensity on 28 February

Meteorological history
- Formed: 21 February 2025
- Dissipated: 9 March 2025

Category 4 severe tropical cyclone
- 10-minute sustained (BOM)
- Highest winds: 165 km/h (105 mph)
- Lowest pressure: 954 hPa (mbar); 28.17 inHg

Category 4-equivalent tropical cyclone
- 1-minute sustained (SSHWS/JTWC)
- Highest winds: 215 km/h (130 mph)
- Lowest pressure: 943 hPa (mbar); 27.85 inHg

Overall effects
- Fatalities: 1
- Injuries: 39
- Missing: 4
- Damage: >$1.36 billion (2025 USD)
- Areas affected: Willis Island, South East Queensland, New South Wales North Coast
- IBTrACS
- Part of the 2024–25 Australian region cyclone season

Severe Tropical Cyclone Alfred was a powerful, long-lived, and erratic tropical cyclone that brought severe effects to South East Queensland and the New South Wales North Coast. As the seventh named storm, and sixth severe tropical cyclone of the 2024–25 Australian region cyclone season, Alfred originated from a tropical low in the Coral Sea on 20 February. Originally the Australian Bureau of Meteorology was to call the next developing cyclone 'Anthony'. But, at the last minute this cyclone was named 'Alfred' as the Bureau's policy is not to use names which match a prominent person at that time, in this case, prime minister Anthony Albanese.

Expected to be one of the most significant weather events in recent Australian history, Cyclone Alfred prompted watches, warnings and evacuations in South East Queensland and Northern New South Wales, a highly populated area which has rarely experienced direct impacts from tropical cyclones. However, the cyclone had less impact than expected, becoming a tropical low shortly before making landfall on 8 March; nevertheless, its heavy rainfall brought severe flooding to the region.

At least one fatality has been reported due to the cyclone, while four others are reportedly unaccounted for. Several injuries have been reported as well, mostly due to a road collision involving the Australian Defence Force that occurred during the height of the storm south of Lismore. Alfred caused an estimated US$1.36 billion economic loss.

== Meteorological history ==
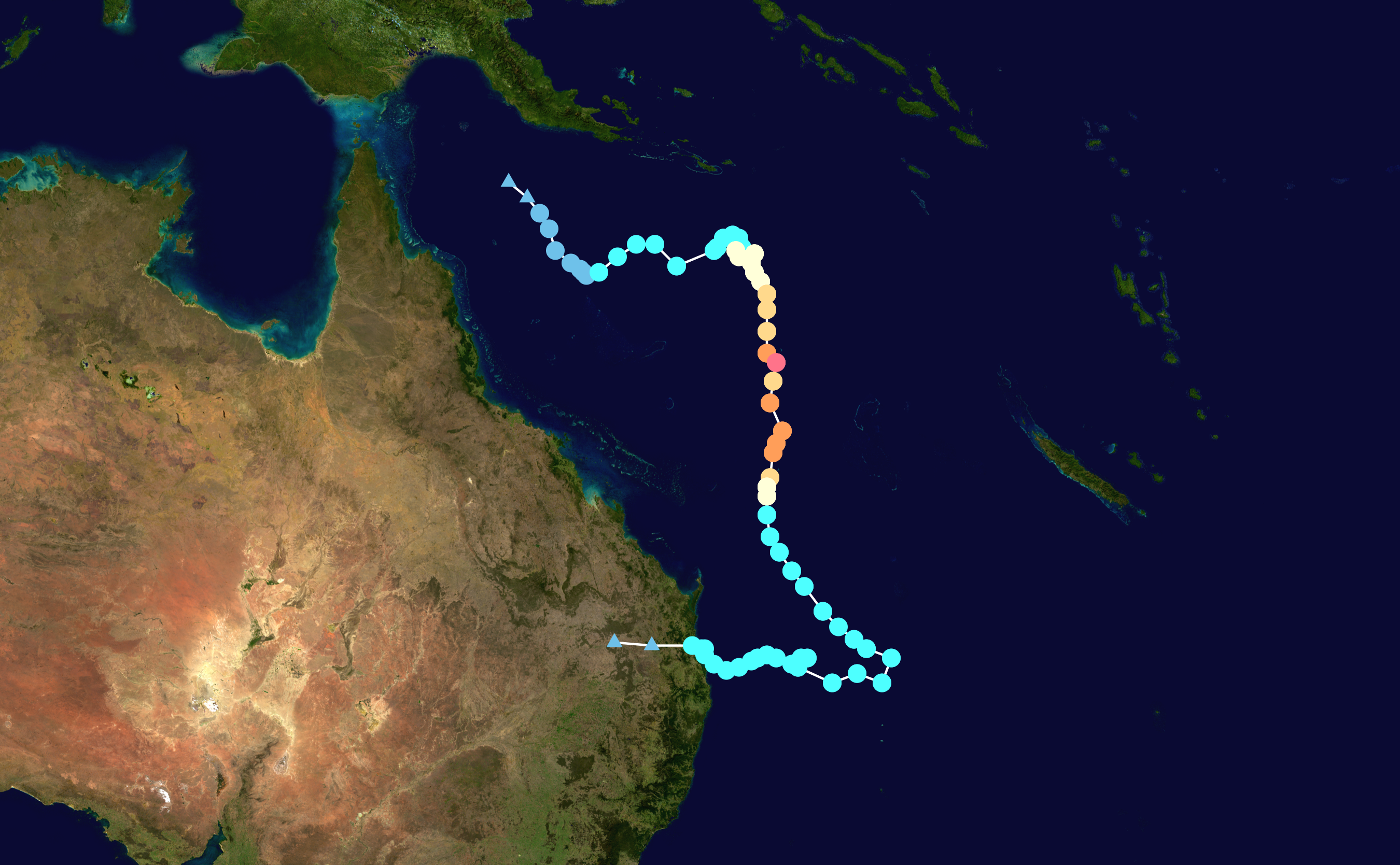
Map plotting the storm's track and intensity, according to the Saffir–Simpson scale Map key Saffir–Simpson scale Tropical depression (≤38 mph, ≤62 km/h) Tropical storm (39–73 mph, 63–118 km/h) Category 1 (74–95 mph, 119–153 km/h) Category 2 (96–110 mph, 154–177 km/h) Category 3 (111–129 mph, 178–208 km/h) Category 4 (130–156 mph, 209–251 km/h) Category 5 (≥157 mph, ≥252 km/h) Unknown Storm type Tropical cyclone Subtropical cyclone Extratropical cyclone, remnant low, tropical disturbance, or monsoon depression

On 20 February the United States Joint Typhoon Warning Center (JTWC) started to publicly monitor a tropical disturbance that had developed about 350 km (215 mi) to the southwest of Port Moresby in Papua New Guinea. At this time, atmospheric convection was flaring over the eastern edge of the system's broad low-level circulation center, while it was located within an favourable environment for further development with low to moderate vertical wind shear and warm sea surface temperatures of 29–30 °C (84–86 °F). During that day, the system's low-level circulation centre consolidated as it moved south-eastwards, before the Australian Bureau of Meteorology (BoM) classified it as Tropical Low 22U, while it was located about 370 km (230 mi) to the northeast of Cooktown, Queensland. A high swell warning was put in place in southeastern Papua New Guinea. Over the next couple of days, the system continued to develop further as it generally moved eastwards, before the JTWC initiated advisories and classified it as Tropical Cyclone 22P on 22 February. Initially, the BOM did not immediately follow suit and kept it as a tropical low; however, around 16:20 AEST, the BoM reported that the system had developed into a category 1 tropical cyclone on the Australian tropical cyclone intensity scale and named it Alfred. Alfred formed alongside Cyclone Rae and Tropical Depression 10F, which would later develop into Cyclone Seru.

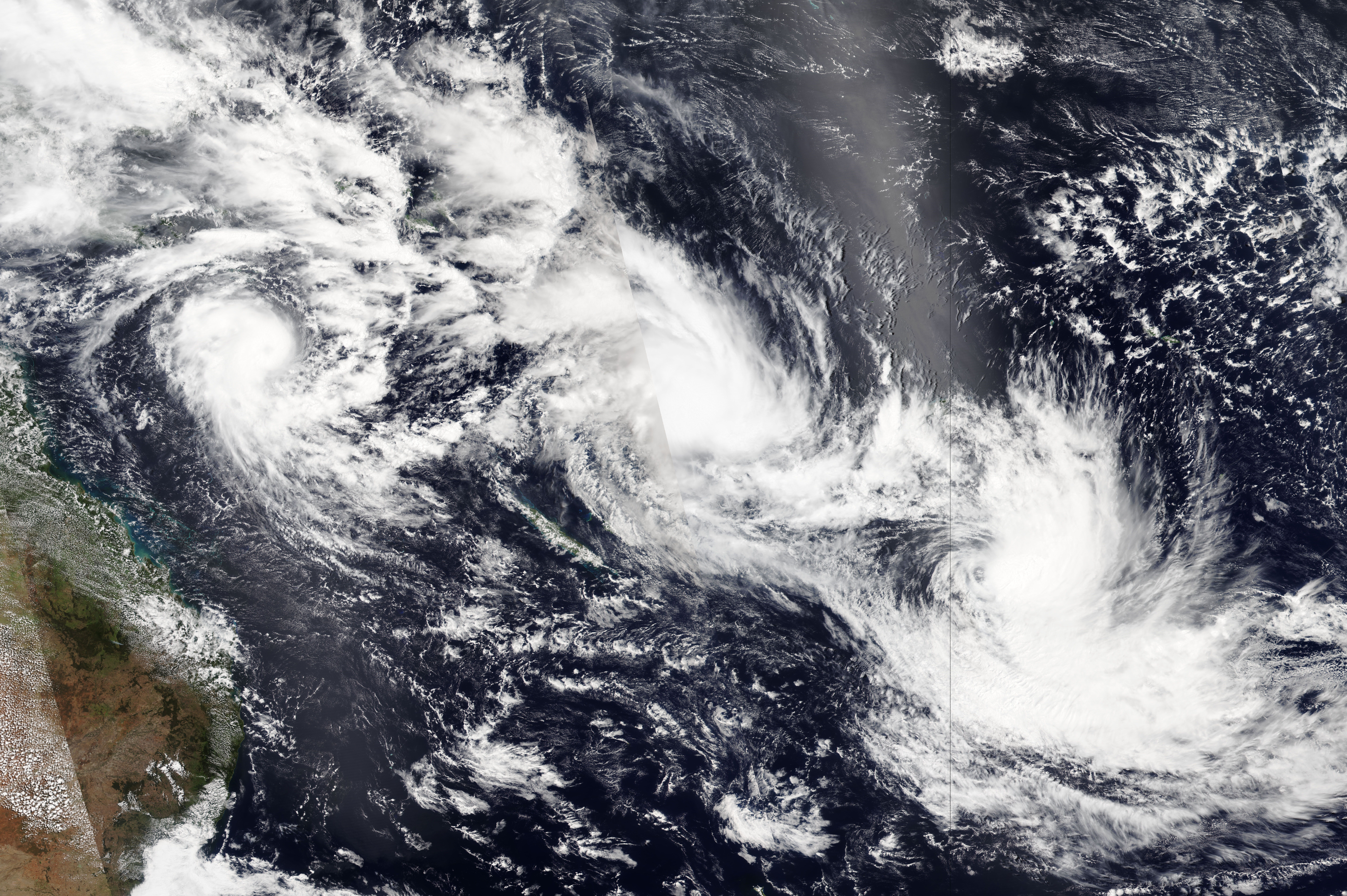
Three systems active on 25 February: Cyclone Alfred (left), Cyclone Seru (centre), and Cyclone Rae (right).

Alfred approaches South East Queensland and New South Wales

Over the next couple of days, the storm continued to move to the east and was upgraded to a category 2 tropical cyclone on the Australian scale at 16:00 AEST on 24 February. As Alfred then turned south, it also continued to intensify, attaining category 3 status on 26 February at 22:00 AEST. The next day, the BOM further upgraded Alfred to a category 4 cyclone as a small eye appeared on visible satellite imagery. Later that night, Alfred underwent an eyewall replacement cycle (ERC), prompting fluctuation between categories 3 and 4 on 1 March. The following afternoon, environmental conditions became unfavourable and strong wind shear caused Alfred to further weaken to a category 1 the following day. It then fluctuated between category 1 and category 2 status for the next three days as it meandered off the coast. On 3 March, Alfred transitioned into a subtropical cyclone, as it moved over cooler waters, interacting with a subtropical jet stream. Alfred abruptly turned west toward South East Queensland under its steering influence of a subtropical ridge on 4 March. However, on 5 March, environmental conditions became favourable for tropical re-development and the system was reclassified as a category 1 system on 6 March, before re-intensifying into a category 2. The Bureau of Meteorology predicted that landfall could occur between Friday afternoon and the early hours of 8 March. At 23:30 AEST (13:30 UTC) on 7 March, Alfred made landfall on Moreton Island, with winds of 75 km/h (45 mph). At 06:45 AEST on 8 March, Alfred was downgraded to a tropical low before crossing the mainland. The low then stalled near Bribie Island and began to transition back into a subtropical low. At 9pm AEST, Alfred made landfall near Brisbane, before dissipating on 9 March 2025.

The cyclone hit the part of southern Queensland and northern New South Wales, which are not in the tropics, while generally such cyclones occur within the tropical zone. Climate scientists said such out-of-zone cyclones will become more frequent due to climate change.

== Preparations ==
On 3 March the BoM issued a tropical cyclone watch for the coast between Sandy Cape, Queensland and Grafton, New South Wales, which included Brisbane, Gold Coast, Sunshine Coast and Byron Bay but not Grafton. This was the first time a cyclone watch had been issued for Brisbane since a watch was briefly issued for Cyclone Oma during February 2019. During the next day, the watch was upgraded to a warning for the coastline between Double Island Point in Queensland and Yamba in New South Wales, which marked the first time a tropical cyclone warning had been issued for Brisbane since Cyclone Nancy in February 1990.

In the lead up to the storm, three sandbagging stations were opened on the Gold Coast, with a further two opening soon after, due to high demand. Nine sandbagging stations were also opened in Noosa and a further five were opened on the Sunshine Coast. Large swell, and abnormally high tides are occurring along the central, and southern Queensland coast, with significant wave heights of up to 4.87 m recorded in the Wide Bay region, and significant erosion seen across the coast.

A Lithuanian solo-rower, Aurimas Mockus, rowing from San Diego to Brisbane was caught in the cyclone prompting a successful search and rescue by the Royal Australian Navy ship HMAS Choules.

CityCat and ferry services were suspended on Monday evening to allow the vessels to be moved to safety.

=== 4–5 March ===
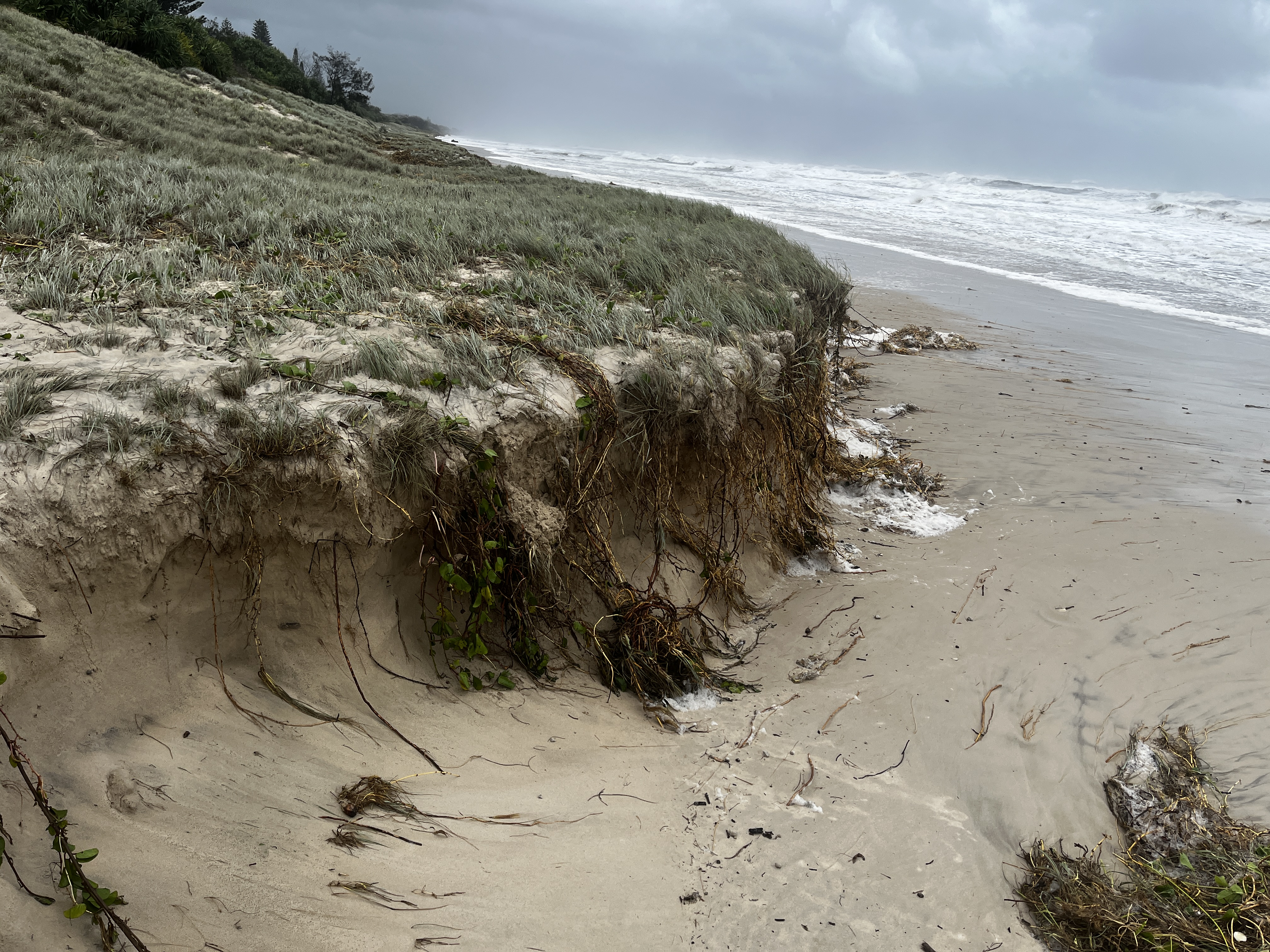
Coastal erosion at Ocean Shores

The Acting Commissioner of the Queensland Police Service, Shane Chelepy, announced that with the assistance of the National Emergency Management Agency that 724,000 sandbags had been made available in South East Queensland.

Both the Australian WPGA Championship and Mooloolaba Triathlon were cancelled. The AFL postponed two matches between Brisbane Lions vs Geelong at The Gabba as well as Gold Coast vs Essendon at People First Stadium. The NRL also followed suit, moving the Dolphins vs South Sydney match from Suncorp Stadium to CommBank Stadium in Sydney. A Green Day concert scheduled for 5 March at the Gold Coast's Cbus Super Stadium was cancelled. The 145th Beenleigh Show was also cancelled, with the showgrounds instead hosting a sandbag station.

The Queensland University of Technology and University of the Sunshine Coast closed for the cyclone's duration from midnight and 10 p.m., respectively. Griffith University announced that it would close its campuses from midnight, with classes and other activities being moved online. Southern Cross University announced immediate closure of both Gold Coast and Lismore campuses, with the Lismore campus being used as an evacuation centre, with classes due to resume on 14 March.

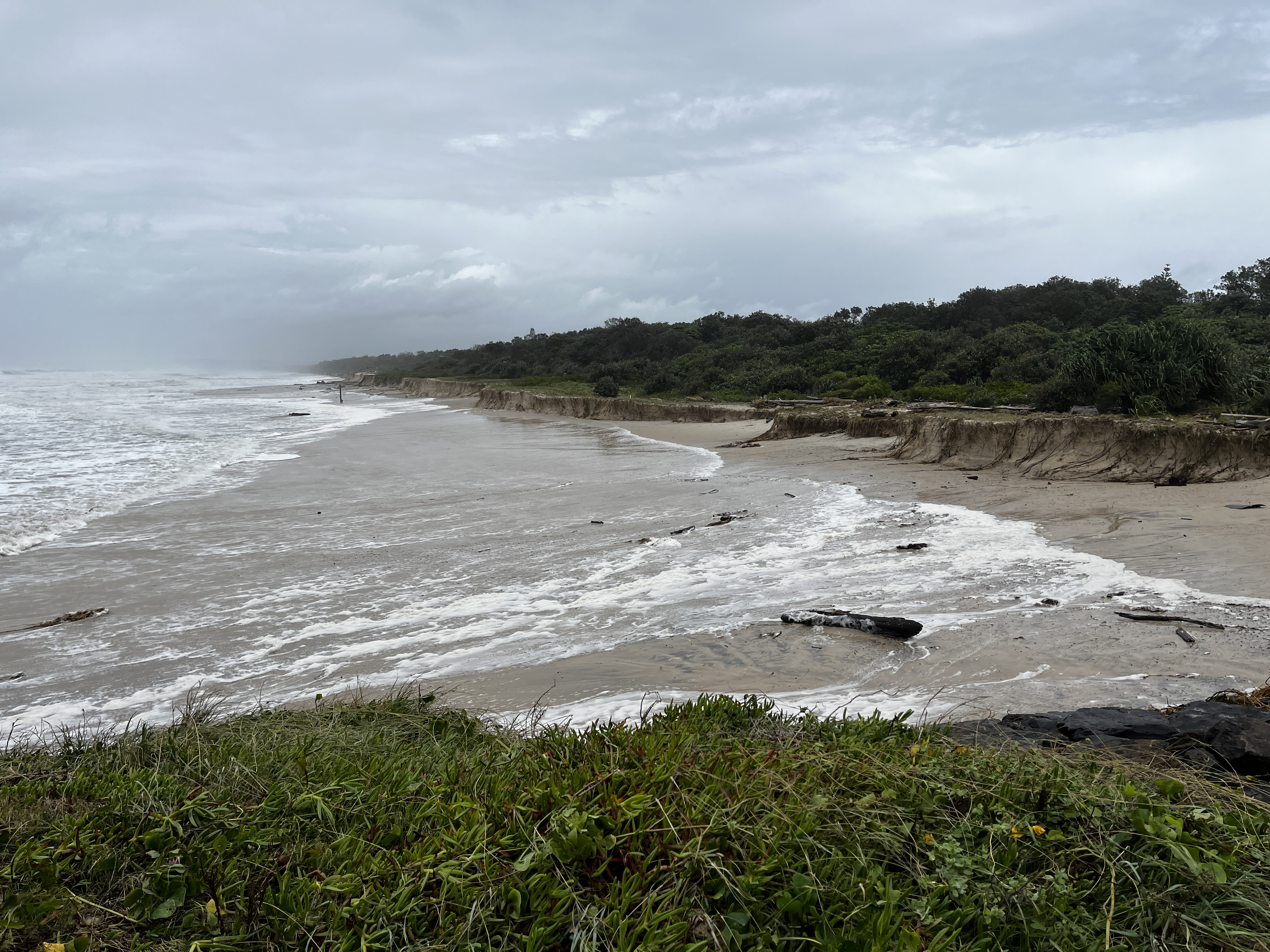
Coastal erosion at Brunswick Heads Main Beach

On 5 March, New South Wales Premier Chris Minns announced the closure of 122 public schools in the Northern Rivers region of New South Wales, with private and Catholic schools announcing they would also close.

The Noosa Council opened the Noosa Leisure Centre as an evacuation centre on the same day. Six evacuation centres were opened in Tweed Heads and a further six in the greater Northern Rivers.

The Queensland Premier David Crisafulli announced that a 'Red Alert' was issued to come into effect from midday for all mariners, requiring vessels with permission only from the Brisbane Harbour Master to be on the water from Redcliffe to Coolangatta. He also announced that all schools in the affected areas would be closed on Thursday and Friday. Later in the afternoon he announced the closure of the Gold Coast Airport, which ceased operations at 4 p.m. Prime Minister Anthony Albanese announced a 'period of emergency' had been enacted that the Australian Defence Force had been activated with immediate effect. Albanese also confirmed that 125,000 sandbags are to be delivered to the Queensland government, with an additional 80,000 being delivered by the Australian Defence Force alone. Additional deployment of heavy-lift helicopters from the fleet was also announced.

The cyclone was also a factor in deciding the date of the federal election, which was to be held by May. In the lead up to March 2025, there was increasing media speculation that Prime Minister Anthony Albanese might call for the federal election in early March, with the election to be held on 12 April. On the eve of the cyclone landfall (7 March), Albanese announced that he had ruled out a 12 April election. This was to prevent the need for Albanese to leave the recovery zone for Canberra to call the election, and to also prevent the campaign from clashing with upcoming recovery efforts.

=== 6 March ===
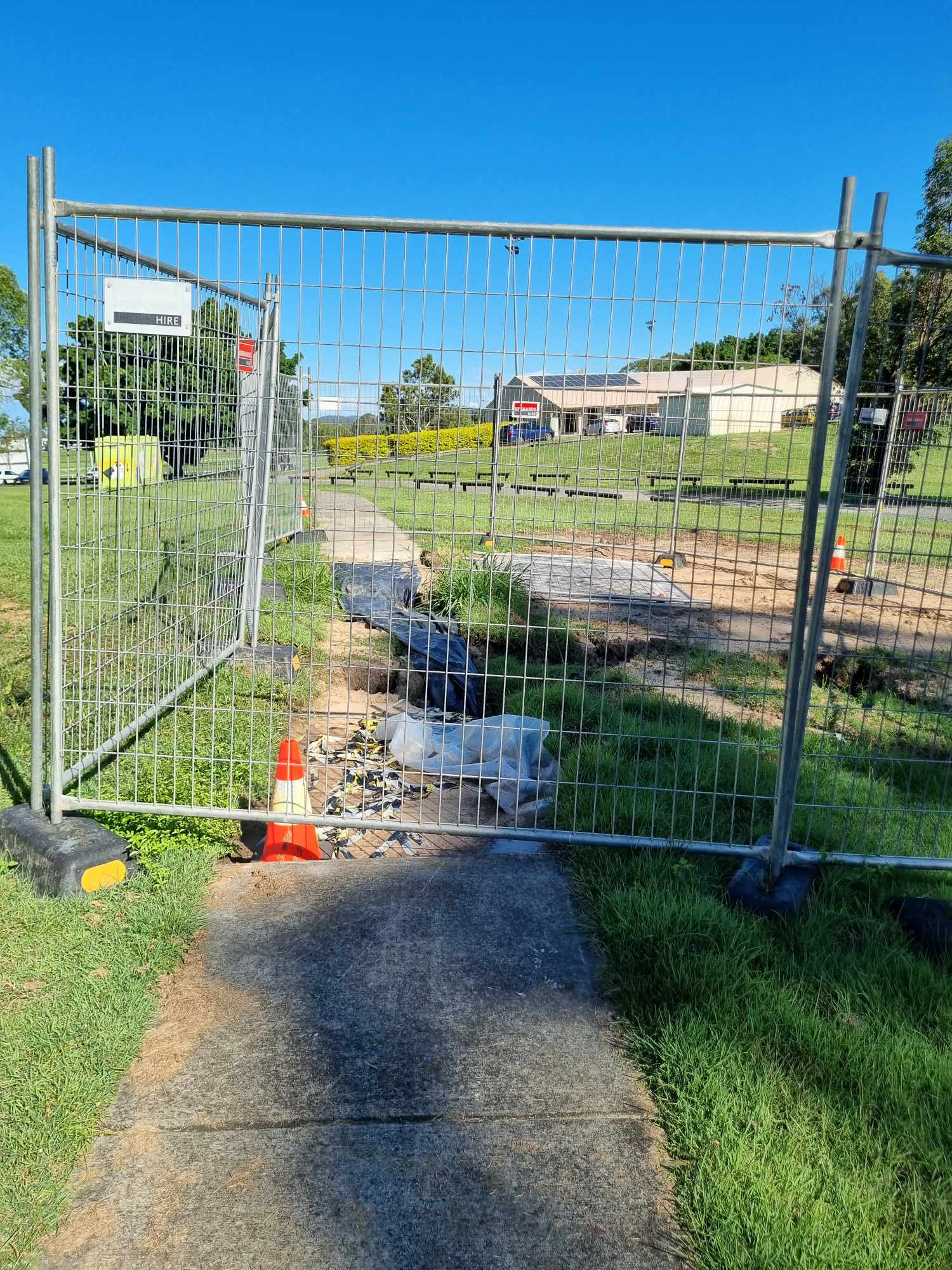
Section of destroyed footpath from heavy rainfall of Cyclone Alfred in Tansey Park

On 6 March, Cyclone Alfred's approach to Brisbane slowed down, further delaying landfall predictions by 6 hours. Public schools, public transport, major roads, and airports began to shut down; however, emergency services still operate. The Brisbane Airport announced it would cease operations at 4 p.m.

At 9 p.m., the first 'Emergency Warning' level warning was issued for the cyclone, for the Redland City Island Communities, which include North Stradbroke Island and the Southern Moreton Bay Islands.

=== 7 March ===
Warnings were issued to Gold Coast residents to stay away from the area due to uncertainty over their stability. The Pacific Highway was closed at Byron Bay and Chinderah. NSW Deputy Premier, Prue Car, announced that all Northern Rivers public, independent and Catholic schools would continue to be shut on Monday 10th.

Airservices Australia issued a warning for all travellers that there would be airport delays across the country due to its Brisbane radar being impacted by the cyclone, with midair radars across the East coast being at risk of having no signal. Albanese announced that 120 Australian Defence Force personnel had been deployed to Northern New South Wales to support the State Emergency Services. At 15:50 AEST and 16:00 AEST, respectively, an 'Emergency Warning' level warning was issued for the Gold Coast and Redland City.

== Impact ==
Wettest tropical cyclones and their remnants in Australia Highest-known totals
Precipitation			Storm	Location	Ref.
Rank	mm	in	Storm	Location	Ref.
1	2,252	88.66	Jasper 2023	Bairds	
2	1,947	76.65	Peter 1979	Mount Bellenden Ker	
3	1,870	73.62	Rona 1999	Mount Bellenden Ker	
4	1,318	51.89	Wanda 1974	Mount Glorious	
5	1,256.8	49.48	Fletcher 2014	Kowanyama	
6	1,111	43.74	Alfred 2025	Upper Springbrook	
7	1,082	42.60	Aivu 1989	Dalrymple Heights	
8	1,065	41.93	May 1998	Burketown	
9	1,000	39.37	Justin 1997	Willis Island	
10	1,000	39.37	Ellie 2009		

On 6 March, at about 15:00 AEST, it was reported that a jet skier had gone missing, with the jet ski recovered near Broadbeach, Queensland. Torrential downpours occurred in the region that day.

Gusts of over 100 km/h (62 mph) were recorded at the Gold Coast and Byron Bay between 12:00 and 08:00 AEST on 7 March. Large pine trees had fallen in Kirra due to strong winds. By 15:00 AEST, 80,000 properties across Queensland and New South Wales had lost power. The Northern Rivers began experiencing widespread power outages, with 43,000 homes left without power due to trees falling on power lines overnight. A man went missing and was later found dead after his car was swept away by floodwaters in Dorrigo, New South Wales. A 12-year-old girl was left missing in Redland Bay, Queensland. In Lismore, New South Wales, a collision involving two Australian Defence Force vehicles left 36 people injured, eight of them seriously, and left two others missing.

On the Gold Coast, a woman was injured and 20 more were evacuated after the cyclone detached the roof of an apartment building, while a couple sustained minor injuries when a tree crashed through the ceiling of their bedroom. In Brisbane, Urban Utilities had to release raw sewerage into the Brisbane River, due to a critical project being overwhelmed by storm water, causing them to issue a warning between Lucas Park and Colmslie Beach Reserve along the river.

Alfred left over 300,000 homes and businesses without power, and caused severe damage to the beaches on Gold Coast and Sunshine Coast. The cyclone caused six million cubic meters of sand to be eroded from the Gold Coast beaches. The Gold Coast City Council hoped to have its beaches repaired by Easter to ensure tourism was not affected.

== Aftermath ==
=== Queensland ===
Costliest Australian region tropical cyclones
Rank	Tropical cyclones	Season	Damage
1	4 Yasi	2010–11	$3.6 billion
2	4 Debbie	2016–17	$2.73 billion
3	TS Oswald	2012–13	$2.52 billion
4	4 Alfred	2024–25	$1.36 billion
5	4 Veronica	2018–19	$1.2 billion
6	5 Ita	2013–14	$1.15 billion
7	4 Larry	2005–06	$1.1 billion
8	4 Zelia	2024–25	$733 million
9	4 Jasper	2023–24	$670 million
10	3 Tracy	1974–75	$645 million

More than 10,000 residents in South East Queensland and Northern NSW were under emergency warnings and around 1,800 were cut off by severe flooding. Beach recovery involves large-scale replenishment, dredging sand from the ocean and pump it back onto eroded beaches. Although beaches became accessible, full restoration of sand on the beaches are expected to be completed in at least 2028, as the cyclone caused severe erosion and left high sand cliffs, due to the storm surge. The Australian Government Disaster Recovery Payment provided availability, to aid recovery for individuals who have experienced the effects of Ex-Tropical Cyclone Alfred.

=== New South Wales ===
Lismore City Council has commenced a structural recovery plan and underwent immediate reconstruction works following the cyclone's impacts. The Disaster Recovery Funding Arrangements allocated $15 million to start a Community Recovery Support Fund following the impacts of the Cyclone. The funds were backed up by the Albanese and Minns government, to help New South Wales and their communities, including Lismore to undergo essential restoration and recovery.

=== Retirement ===
As a result of the significant damage and impacts across South East Queensland and Northern New South Wales caused by the cyclone, the name Alfred was retired by the Bureau of Meteorology from the list of names in the Australian basin. It was replaced with Akio for future seasons.

== Politics ==
Liberal opposition leader Peter Dutton and LNP Gold Coast Mayor Tom Tate were criticised for not being in their electorate during the crisis. Peter Dutton had flown out of his seat of Dickson to Sydney to attend a fundraising dinner hosted by businessman Justin Hemmes and raised over $500,000 for the Coalition. Dutton cancelled the rest of his fundraising appointments the next day after the news broke. Gold Coast Mayor Tom Tate had travelled to Las Vegas to watch an NRL game and was unable to return to the Gold Coast until after the cyclone passed due to flights being cancelled due to the cyclone.

== See also ==
- Tropical cyclones in 2025
- Weather of 2025
- Cyclone Jasper (2023) – another storm which significantly weakened before reaching the Queensland coast.
