= Cyclone Rewa =

Category 5 South Pacific and Australian region cyclone in 1993 and 1994

Severe Tropical Cyclone Rewa
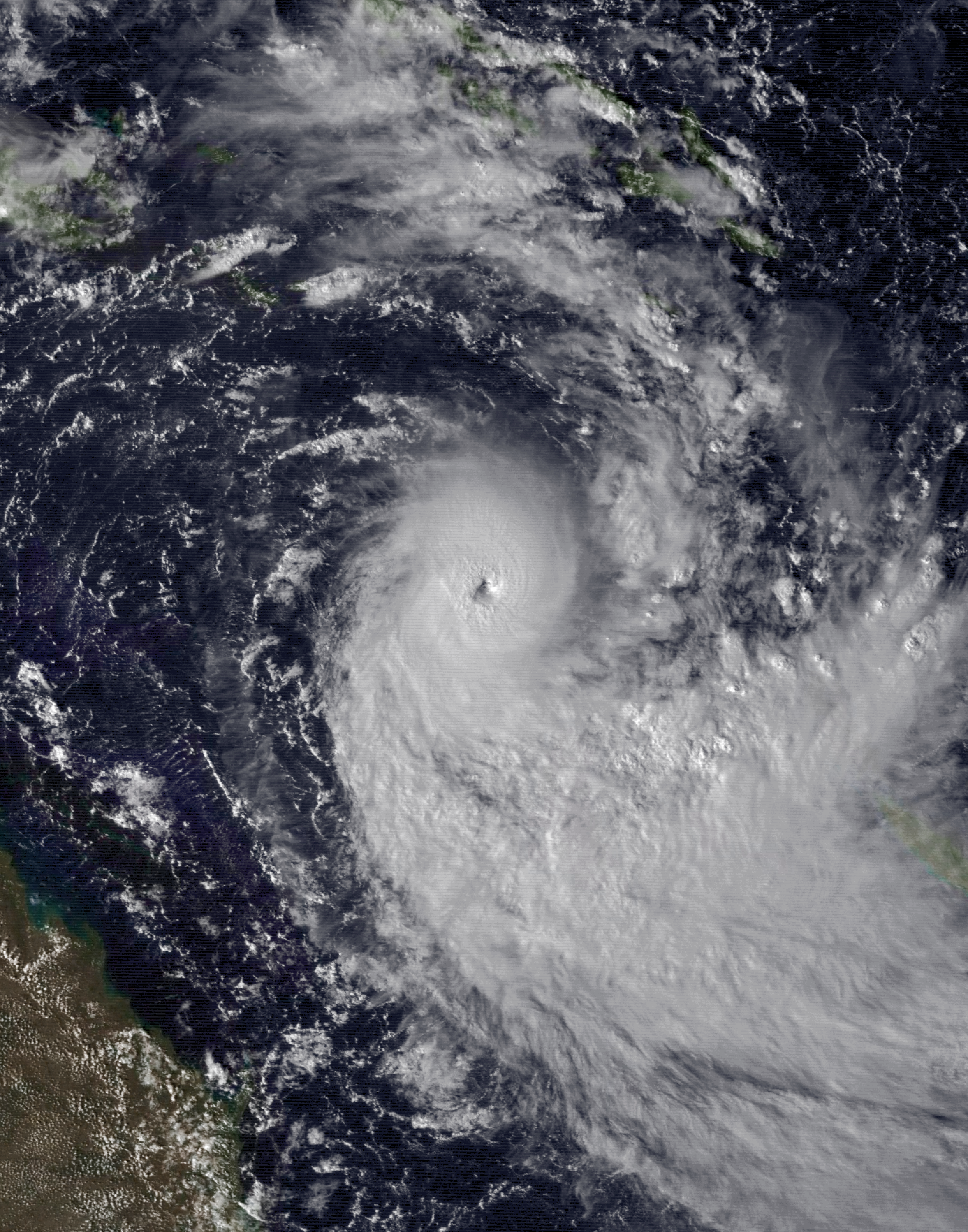
- Cyclone Rewa at its second peak intensity on 16 January

Meteorological history
- Formed: 26 December 1993
- Extratropical: 21 January 1994
- Dissipated: 23 January 1994

Category 5 severe tropical cyclone
- 10-minute sustained (BOM)
- Highest winds: 205 km/h (125 mph)
- Lowest pressure: 920 hPa (mbar); 27.17 inHg

Category 4-equivalent tropical cyclone
- 1-minute sustained (SSHWS/JTWC)
- Highest winds: 230 km/h (145 mph)
- Lowest pressure: 915 hPa (mbar); 27.02 inHg

Overall effects
- Fatalities: 22
- Damage: Unknown
- Areas affected: Solomon Islands, Papua New Guinea, Eastern Australia, New Caledonia, Vanuatu and New Zealand
- IBTrACS
- Part of the 1993–94 South Pacific and Australian region cyclone seasons

Severe Tropical Cyclone Rewa affected six countries and caused 22 deaths on its 28-day journey across the South Pacific Ocean in December 1993 and January 1994. Cyclone Rewa developed from a tropical disturbance on 28 December south of Nauru. After forming, Rewa moved southwest through the Solomon Islands, crossing the 160th meridian east from the South Pacific basin into the Australian region. The cyclone began to strengthen steadily and turned southward, paralleling the eastern Australian coast through 31 December. Rewa reached its initial peak intensity as a Category 4 tropical cyclone on 2 January. It maintained this intensity for about 12 hours before an increase in wind shear induced its weakening by 3 January. The cyclone turned southeastward and moved back into the South Pacific basin on 4 January, before it passed over New Caledonia between 5–6 January. After affecting New Caledonia, Rewa weakened to a tropical depression and turned northwestward before re-entering the Australian basin on 10 January.

Over the following days, the cyclone showed signs of restrengthening and executed an elongated cyclonic loop to the southeast of Papua New Guinea. Rewa subsequently entered a phase of quick intensification while proceeding southeastward, peaking in intensity as a Category 5 severe tropical cyclone. It recurved toward the southwest while gradually weakening for several days. Although forecasters had predicted Rewa to make landfall near Mackay, Queensland, the cyclone began interacting with an upper-level trough on 18 January, causing it to divert to the southeast and move along the Queensland coast. Rewa transitioned into an extratropical cyclone on 20 January, with its remnants bringing heavy rain to New Zealand three days later.

The cyclone caused the deaths of 22 people on its course, affecting parts of the Solomon Islands, Papua New Guinea, Eastern Australia, New Caledonia, Vanuatu and New Zealand. Nine people in a banana dinghy en route to Rossel Island went missing at the height of the storm; they were presumed drowned after wreckage from their boat turned up at the island. In Queensland, three people died in traffic accidents caused by the storm, and another fatality occurred when a boy became trapped in a storm pipe. One death took place in New Caledonia, while flooding caused eight drownings in Papua New Guinea. Because of the severe impacts that Rewa brought, the name was retired.

== Meteorological history ==
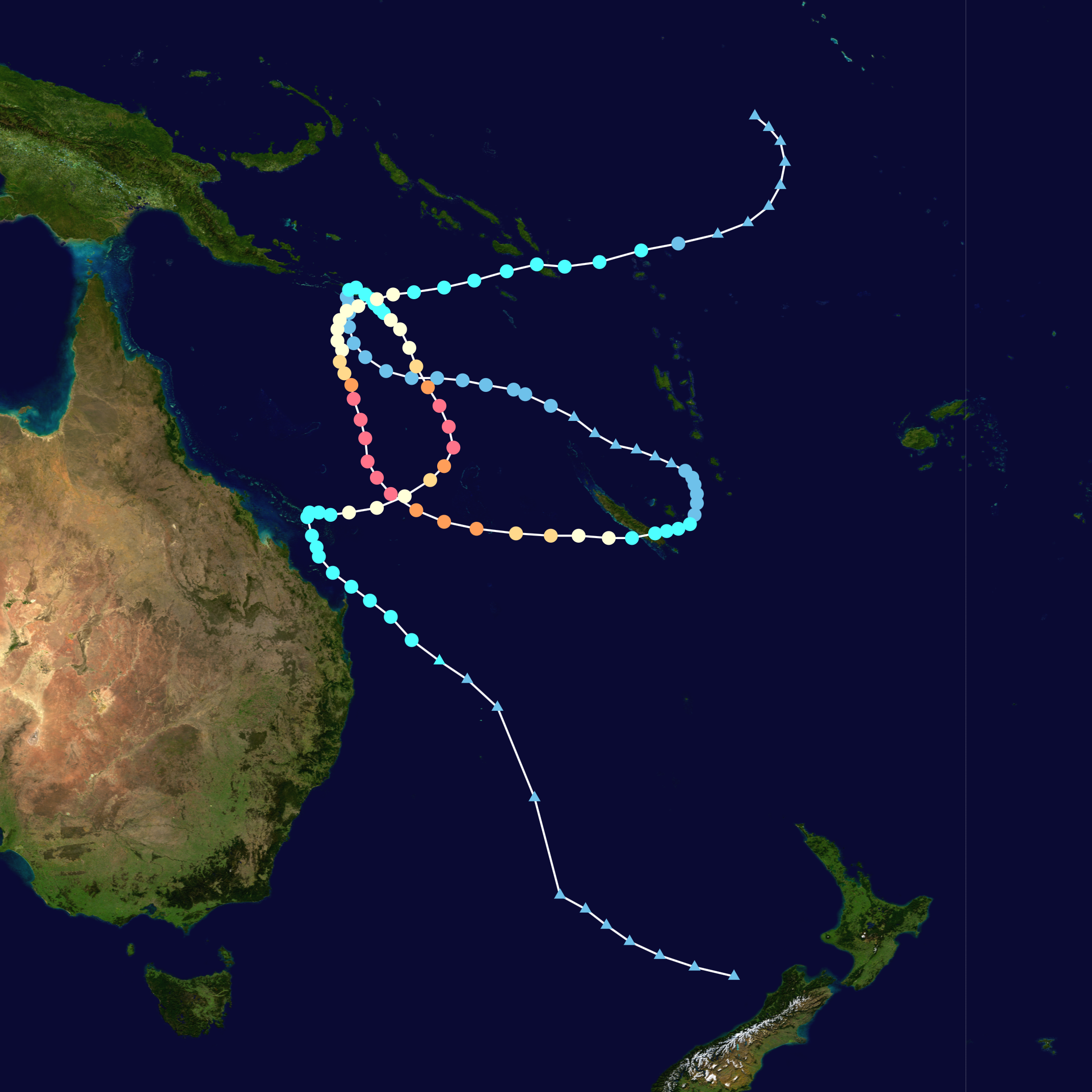
Map plotting the storm's track and intensity, according to the Saffir–Simpson scale Map key Saffir–Simpson scale Tropical depression (≤38 mph, ≤62 km/h) Tropical storm (39–73 mph, 63–118 km/h) Category 1 (74–95 mph, 119–153 km/h) Category 2 (96–110 mph, 154–177 km/h) Category 3 (111–129 mph, 178–208 km/h) Category 4 (130–156 mph, 209–251 km/h) Category 5 (≥157 mph, ≥252 km/h) Unknown Storm type Tropical cyclone Subtropical cyclone Extratropical cyclone, remnant low, tropical disturbance, or monsoon depression

During 26 December, the Fiji Meteorological Service (FMS) started to monitor a tropical depression that had developed within the Intertropical Convergence Zone, about 575 km (355 mi) to the south-east of Nauru. Over the next few days the depression gradually developed and organised further, as it moved towards the west-southwest under the influence of a north-easterly steering flow. During 28 December, the JTWC classified the depression as Tropical Cyclone 05P, before the FMS named it Rewa as it had become a category 1 tropical cyclone on the Australian tropical cyclone intensity scale. Over the next few days, the system gradually intensified under the influence of favorable upper-level winds while it moved towards the south-southwest, passing through the Solomon Islands on 29 December and affecting the southeastern islands of Papua New Guinea. As it moved through the Solomon Islands, Rewa moved out of the South Pacific basin and into the Australian region, where the Australian Bureau of Meteorology (BOM) took the primary warning responsibility for the system.

On December 30, the JTWC reported that Rewa had become equivalent to a category 1 hurricane on the Saffir-Simpson hurricane scale (SSHS); early the next day the BoM reported that the system had developed into a category 3 severe tropical cyclone, and an eye became visible on satellite imagery. The system then abruptly turned and started to move towards the south parallel to the Queensland coast because of an interaction with an upper-level trough of low pressure. During 2 January, Rewa's eye became well defined and compact on microwave imagery, as it fluctuated in intensity, with Dvorak technique numbers of 6.0 and 7.0 recorded before it reached its peak intensities. As a result of these numbers, the BoM estimated 10 - minute sustained windspeeds of 205 km/h (125 mph) and a minimum pressure of 920 hectopascals (27.17 inHg), which made it a category 5 severe tropical cyclone on the Australian Scale. Meanwhile, the JTWC estimated that Rewa had peaked with 1-minute sustained windspeeds of 230 km/h (145 mph), which made it a category 4 hurricane on the SSHWS. Rewa remained at its peak intensity for 24 hours before the system started to weaken during January 3, as strengthening upper level north-westerlies increased vertical wind shear over the system. Throughout that day, the cyclone started to move towards the south-east, before it started to take a more eastwards track as it approached 160°E.

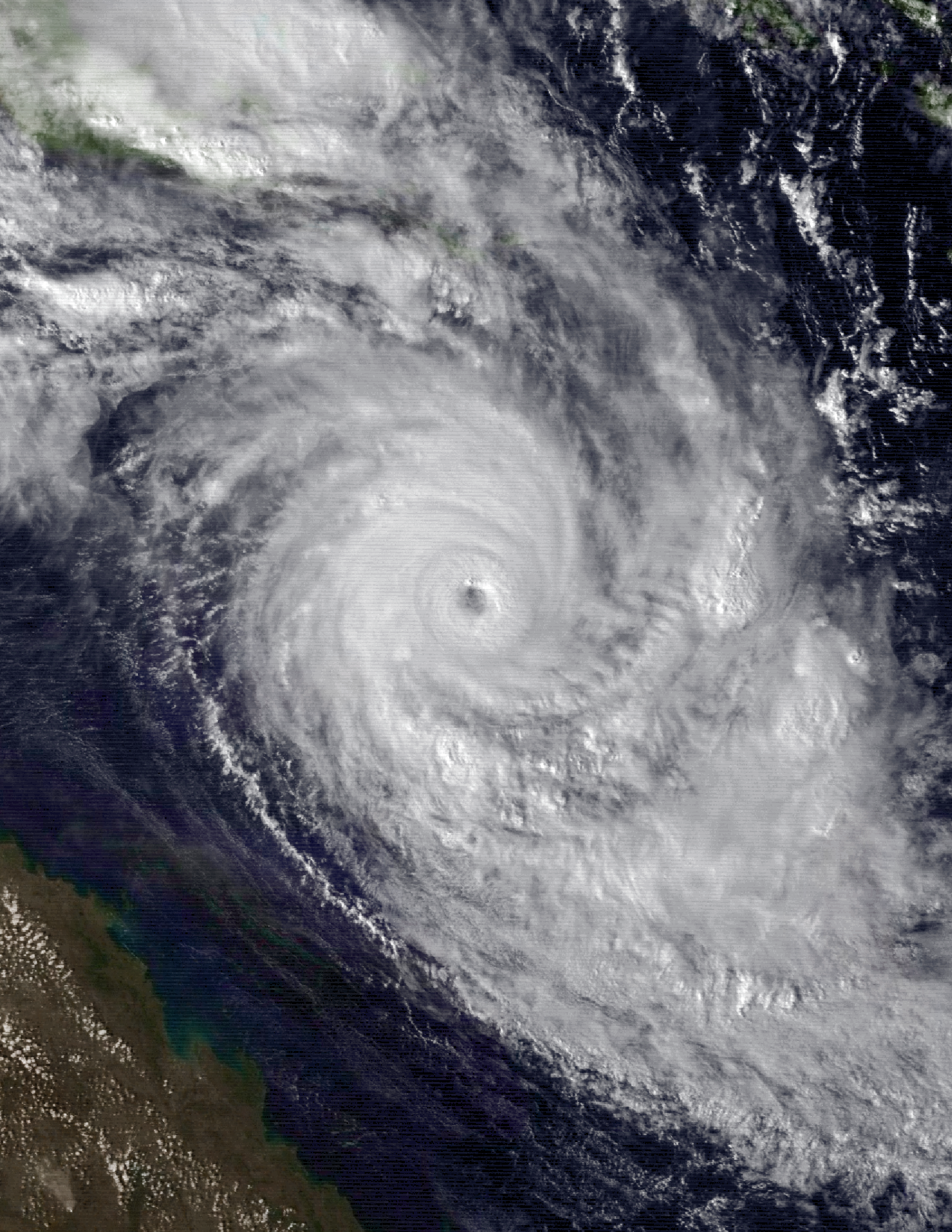
Rewa at its first peak intensity on 2 January

During 4 January, Rewa moved back into the South Pacific basin and continued eastward as a weakening category 3 severe tropical cyclone, with 10-minute sustained wind speeds estimated at 140 km/h (85 mph). During the next day, its eye became obscured after the mountains of New Caledonia affected Rewa's circulation by creating a hot and dry Foehn wind. The FMS reported that the system had weakened into a category 2 tropical cyclone, while the JTWC reported that Rewa had become a tropical storm. The system subsequently made landfall in the vicinity of Saint Vincent Bay on New Caledonia's south-western coast, before it emerged near Thio from the east coast during 6 January. By January 7, Rewa's circulation had become exposed under the influence of upper-level north-westerlies; as a result both the FMS and JTWC reported that Rewa had weakened into a depression. Over the next 3 days, the residual low-level circulation was steered towards the northwest and Papua New Guinea in a southeasterly trade wind flow generated by a powerful area of high pressure located between New Zealand and Kermadec Islands. During 10 January, Rewa's remnants moved out of the South Pacific basin and back into the Australian region while starting to re-intensify into a tropical cyclone, as a mid to upper-level trough over eastern Australia increased in size.

As it moved into the Australian region, Rewa began to move in a long arc to the northwest and then to the north, and on January 13, both the JTWC and the Papua New Guinea National Weather Service reported that the system had re-intensified into a tropical cyclone around Papua New Guinea's southern islands. Later that day, Rewa executed a sharp clockwise turn near Tagula Island and started to move towards the southeast and the BoM's area of responsibility while gradually intensifying further. During January 15, the BoM reported that the system had re-intensified into a category 3 severe tropical cyclone, while the JTWC reported that Rewa had become equivalent to a category 1 hurricane again. Later that day, the system started to rapidly intensify as an upper-level trough approached the system. During the next day the JTWC reported that the system had peaked with 1-minute sustained windspeeds of 230 km/h (145 mph). The BoM then reported later that day, that Rewa had peaked with 10-minute sustained windspeeds of 205 km/h (125 mph), which made it a category 5 severe tropical cyclone on the Australian tropical cyclone intensity scale. After it had peaked in intensity, the system recurved towards the south-southwest where it started to weaken gradually. By 18 January the JTWC reported that Rewa had weakened into a tropical storm, while throughout that day the BoM assessed Rewa as a category 3 severe tropical cyclone. During the next day, the BoM reported that Rewa had weakened into a category 2 tropical cyclone as it recurved and started to move towards the south-east about 265 km (165 mi) to the east of Mackay, Queensland. Over the next couple of days the system moved towards the south-southeast along the Queensland coast while maintaining its intensity. During January 21, the BoM and the JTWC reported that Rewa had weakened below cyclone strength, as the system moved back into the South Pacific basin for the third and final time. Rewa's remnants were last noted during 23 January, by New Zealand's Metservice, as they dissipated to the east of the South Island.

== Preparations and impact ==
Twenty-two people lost their lives in accidents caused by Cyclone Rewa, while it affected parts off the Solomon Islands, Papua New Guinea, Australia, New Caledonia, Vanuatu and New Zealand. Due to the impact of this storm, the name Rewa was retired.

=== The Solomon Islands, Vanuatu and New Zealand ===
The Solomon Islands were affected by the developing tropical cyclone between 28–30 December and was the first Island country to be impacted by Rewa. As it developed into a tropical cyclone on 28 December, the system passed to the north of the outer lying atolls of Malaita Province in the Solomon Islands. Rewa then passed over the southern tip of Malaita Island, before passing to the south of Guadalcanal Island and the north of Rennell Island during 29 December.

The system had no effect on Vanuatu while it passed through the Solomon Islands between 28 – 30 December; however the southern islands of Vanuatu were affected by the cyclone after it had passed through New Caledonia during 5 January. As it moved towards the north-west between 6–8 January, Rewa brought high seas and strong winds to parts of the island nation including the provinces of Shefa and Tafea. Some damage was recorded to Port Villa's harbours intertidal zone, as the system passed about 175 km (110 mi) to the southeast of the city.

Between 19–24 January, Rewa's remnants, a slow moving weather front over Fiordland and a southerly brought widespread rainfall and flooding to New Zealand's South Island. In Westland, Fiordland and the Southern Lakes, landslides and flooding occurred on 21 January, while several roads and bridges were damaged.

=== New Caledonia ===
Cyclone Rewa started to affect New Caledonia on 5 January, before it passed over Grand Terre Island later that day. Rewa dumped over 300 mm (12 in) of rain on parts of the archipelago, which made all of the major rivers overflow and burst their banks. Several landslides and a death were recorded within New Caledonia, while on the Loyalty Island of Mare, waves from Rewa partially destroyed the harbour wall at Tadine's port.

=== Papua New Guinea ===
Cyclone Rewa affected Papua New Guinea on two separate occasions while it was active, with the cyclone first affecting the archipelago between 28 December and 1 January, before grazing the archipelago between 12–14 January. Before Rewa affected the country, cyclone alerts and warnings were issued for Sudest, Rossel and Samarai islands, while authorities urged people not to go to beaches. As it affected the archipelago, Rewa brought heavy rainfall, high seas, and wind gusts of up to 100 km/h (60 mph) to parts of the archipelago including Sudest, Rossel and Samarai islands. The hardest hit areas were communities near major river systems, with the cyclone blocking roads, destroying a church, bridges, homes and gardens with vital crops such as coffee and copra destroyed. In total, Cyclone Rewa left around 3500 people homeless and caused 17 deaths, 8 of which were due to flooding. Nine other people went missing while travelling to Rossel Island after their boat was caught up in high seas associated with Rewa. They were later presumed dead by the National Disaster and Emergency Service, after a local search and rescue mission found wreckage of the boat. At 00:00 UTC on 30 December, the automatic weather station at Jingo on Rossel island recorded a maximum sustained wind of 55 km/h (35 mph).

=== Australia ===
During the opening days of 1994, Rewa moved southwards parallel to the Queensland coast; however, because it was located about 600 km (370 mi) to the north-east of Mackay, it was too far away from the coast for there to be any direct impact on Queensland. The only indirect impact was higher surf, from which several people had to be rescued from before the cyclone started to move towards New Caledonia during 4 January. As Rewa affected Queensland for the second time, watches and warnings were issued for various parts of Queensland by the BoM, who predicted a landfall near Mackay. On 18 January local disaster committees met to consider evacuating people, while people who were on vacation in national parks were alerted about Rewa by a helicopter. A military training exercise that was due to take place in Shoalwater Bay had to be cancelled, with army personnel evacuated to Rockhampton to avoid being cut off by flood waters. Along the coast, several ports including Gladstone were shut with large vessels told to head to sea and small vessels told to batten down and prepare for the storm.

On 19 January Rewa started to affect Queensland with torrential rain and storm force windspeeds which caused some damage along the coast. However it did not make its predicted landfall near Mackay, instead it recurved to the south-southeast and came to within 100 km (60 mi) of the coast. Two men off Yeppoon's coast were rescued from a fishing trawler by an army Black Hawk helicopter after high seas damaged the trawler's propeller and snapped its heavy anchor chain, leaving it drifting helplessly in the cyclone's path. The worst affected island was Lady Elliot as it bore the brunt of the wind, while on Heron Island, several rare trees and bird rookeries were either destroyed or severely damaged. As Rewa interacted with an upper trough of low pressure on 19 January, heavy rainfall and thunderstorms were observed in parts of Brisbane and the Gold Coast. Brisbane received over 144 mm (5.7 in) in just six hours, which led to some localised flash flooding in parts of the city and four deaths. Three of the deaths were from people crashing their cars, while the other death occurred when a person went surfing Brisbane's flood water and got trapped in a storm drain. Within Brisbane, 100 homes and 20 cars were damaged by the flood waters, while a Sheffield Shield cricket match between Western Australia and Queensland was delayed, after the Gabba resembled a small lake.

== See also ==
- Cyclone Katrina (1998) – another erratic and long-lived tropical cyclone
- Hurricane John (1994) – the longest-tracked tropical cyclone on record
- Cyclone Freddy (2023) – the longest-lived tropical cyclone record
