= Cyclone Veronica =

Category 5 Australian region cyclone in 2019

Severe Tropical Cyclone Veronica
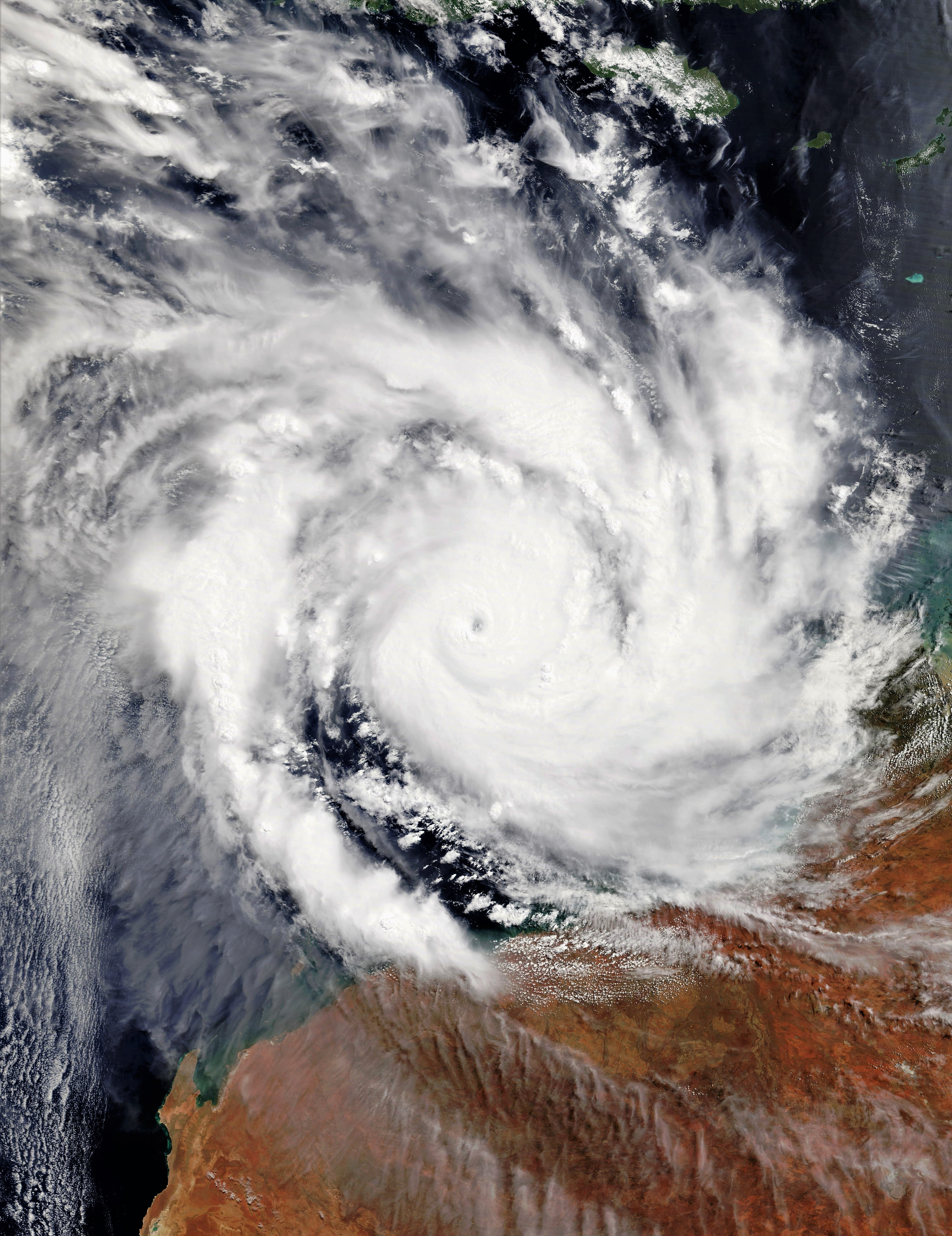
- Cyclone Veronica at peak intensity nearing its landfall in Western Australia on 21 March

Meteorological history
- Formed: 18 March 2019
- Remnant low: 30 March 2019
- Dissipated: 31 March 2019

Category 5 severe tropical cyclone
- 10-minute sustained (BOM)
- Highest winds: 215 km/h (130 mph)
- Highest gusts: 295 km/h (185 mph)
- Lowest pressure: 928 hPa (mbar); 27.40 inHg

Category 4-equivalent tropical cyclone
- 1-minute sustained (SSHWS/JTWC)
- Highest winds: 240 km/h (150 mph)
- Lowest pressure: 925 hPa (mbar); 27.32 inHg

Overall effects
- Fatalities: None
- Economic losses: $1.2 billion (2019 USD)
- Areas affected: Timor, Western Australia
- IBTrACS /
- Part of the 2018–19 Australian region cyclone season

Severe Tropical Cyclone Veronica was a large and powerful tropical cyclone which brought major impacts to the Pilbara region of Western Australia during March 2019. The nineteenth tropical low, eighth tropical cyclone and fifth severe tropical cyclone on the 2018–19 Australian region cyclone season, Veronica first appeared as a tropical low near East Timor on 18 March 2019. The system was slow to develop initially while tracking southwestwards through the Timor Sea, but began to consolidate the following day. The storm was upgraded by the Bureau of Meteorology to a Category 1 tropical cyclone on the Australian scale at 18:00 UTC on 19 March, by which time a steady development trend had begun. Upon attaining Category 2 status at 06:00 UTC on 20 March, Veronica underwent a period of explosive intensification. The system became a severe tropical cyclone six hours later, and Category 4 just six hours after that. Veronica reached peak intensity at 06:00 UTC the following day as a high-end Category 4 severe tropical cyclone, with ten-minute sustained winds estimated at 195 km/h (120 mph), and a central barometric pressure of 938 hPa (27.70 inHg). The United States' Joint Typhoon Warning Center estimated that the system was generating one-minute sustained winds of 230 km/h (145 mph), equivalent to a mid-range Category 4 major hurricane on the Saffir-Simpson hurricane wind scale. Veronica proceeded to weaken very gradually over the following few days as it turned towards Western Australia's Pilbara coastline. The system weakened to Category 3 while located just off the Pilbara coast, where it became almost stationary for 24 hours. Veronica began to weaken more quickly as it accelerated westwards on 25 March, tracking parallel to the coast. The system was downgraded below tropical cyclone intensity on 26 March, and after making landfall on North West Cape later that day, the system began to track away from the Australian mainland. Ex-Tropical Cyclone Veronica dissipated on 31 March over the eastern Indian Ocean.

When Veronica struck Australia in March 2019, it flooded major areas and caused about $1.7 billion in economic losses, primarily from disruptions to iron ore exports, although no fatalities were reported, making it one of three billion-dollar tropical cyclones which caused zero deaths, the other two being Typhoon Jongdari in the North Pacific that occurred the previous year, and Hurricane Francine in the North Atlantic which happened more than five years later. Veronica also formed near the time when Cyclone Trevor made landfall in Queensland. Most of the coastal regions of the Pilbara suffered some level of damage.

== Meteorological history ==
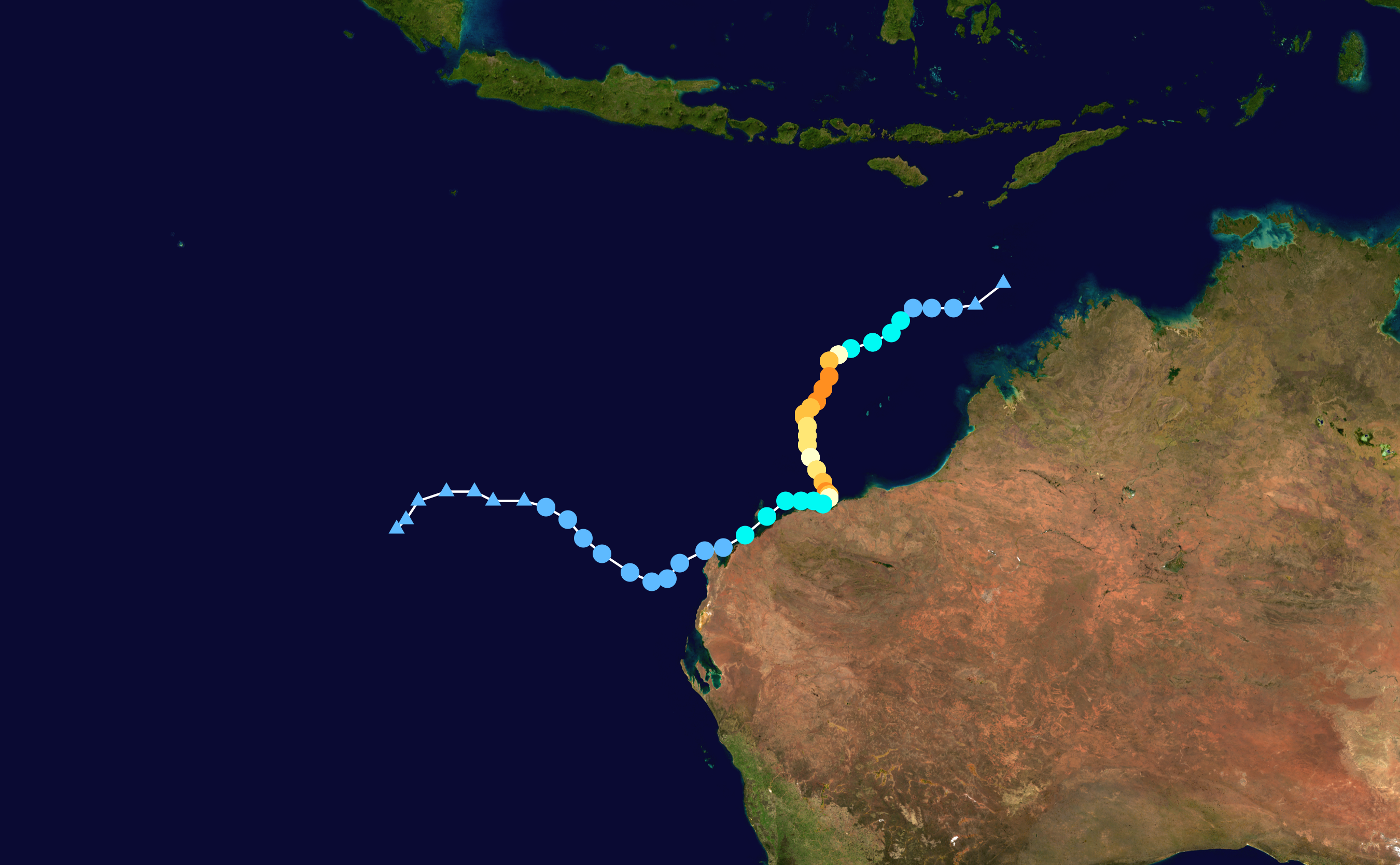
Map plotting the storm's track and intensity, according to the Saffir–Simpson scale Map key Saffir–Simpson scale Tropical depression (≤38 mph, ≤62 km/h) Tropical storm (39–73 mph, 63–118 km/h) Category 1 (74–95 mph, 119–153 km/h) Category 2 (96–110 mph, 154–177 km/h) Category 3 (111–129 mph, 178–208 km/h) Category 4 (130–156 mph, 209–251 km/h) Category 5 (≥157 mph, ≥252 km/h) Unknown Storm type Tropical cyclone Subtropical cyclone Extratropical cyclone, remnant low, tropical disturbance, or monsoon depression

On 18 March, a tropical low formed to the southeast of East Timor. At 03:00 AWST on the morning of 20 March, the Bureau of Meteorology assessed the developing tropical low as having attained tropical cyclone strength, and named the system Veronica. Experiencing extremely favorable atmospheric conditions and very warm sea surface temperatures, Tropical Cyclone Veronica proceeded to intensify rapidly throughout the day, attaining Category 3 status on the Australian scale just 18 hours later.

In preparation for passage of Veronica, major shipping ports on the Pilbara coastline were forced to cease operations in the interests of safety. The port of Port Hedland, the most valuable export hub in Australia and one of the largest iron ore loading ports in the world, was closed on 22 March, with operations only resuming nearly four days later. As a result of the disruption to the mining and export operations, Rio Tinto estimated that its iron ore production would suffer reductions of approximately 14 million tonnmetric tonring 2019. Rio Tinto's Cape Lambert port wharf also sustained damage from waves generated by the cyclone, and repairs to the company's Robe River sorting facility following a fire earlier in the year were delayed during the event. Fortescue reported that exports of up to 2 million tonnes of its own iron ore were disrupted during the cyclone. In total, economic costs associated with the mining disruptions and damage caused by Veronica reached $1.7 billion in Rio Tinto.

== Preparations and impact ==
Costliest Australian region tropical cyclones
Rank	Tropical cyclones	Season	Damage
1	4 Yasi	2010–11	$3.6 billion
2	4 Debbie	2016–17	$2.73 billion
3	TS Oswald	2012–13	$2.52 billion
4	4 Alfred	2024–25	$1.36 billion
5	4 Veronica	2018–19	$1.2 billion
6	5 Ita	2013–14	$1.15 billion
7	4 Larry	2005–06	$1.1 billion
8	4 Zelia	2024–25	$733 million
9	4 Jasper	2023–24	$670 million
10	3 Tracy	1974–75	$645 million

=== Iron ore exporters ===
As a result of the disruption to the mining and export operations, Rio Tinto estimated that its iron ore production would suffer reductions of approximately 14 million tonnes during 2019. Rio Tinto’s largest iron ore stockpile was damaged with A$1 million in damages to the ore. The Port of Cape Lambert was also damaged by waves generated by the cyclone. The repairs to Robe River sorting facility were delayed by Veronica. Fortescue reported much of its iron (2 million tonnes) were disrupted by Veronica. Rio Tinto had $1.6 billion of iron ore in the city.

=== Port Hedland ===
The Port of Port Hedland had operations closed, with remaining operations lasting for the next four days in the preparations of Veronica. Ships and residents evacuated the area in case of emergency. Port Hedland was impacted by major flooding, and roofs from homes were thrown across the area, causing up to A$45 million in damage. Winds in nearby South Hedland were estimated at 100 mph gusts and 90 mph winds knocked down a few limbs from trees.

=== Pilbara ===
Businesses in the Pilbara were forced to evacuate the coastline and cease operations in the interests of safety. Residents were also forced to evacuate the area. The Pilbara had also been affected by other cyclones in the following year, namely Cyclones Blake and Damien. Parts of the Pilbara observed high Category 3 winds and gusts. Veronica downed trees and damaged homes there. Thousands of people were affected.

== Retirement ==
Due to the severe economic damage caused by the cyclone in the Pilbara, the name Veronica was retired and will never be used again for another Australian cyclone. It will be replaced by Verity when its corresponding list repeats.

== See also ==
- Cyclone Frank (1995) – Took a similar track to Veronica's
- Cyclone Fay (2004) – Also struck Port Hedland and Pilbara
- Cyclone Trevor (2019) – Another cyclone that formed around the same time as Veronica, and reached a similar intensity
- Cyclone Lili (2019)
- Cyclone Damien (2020) – the next severe tropical cyclone to make landfall on the Pilbara coast.
- Cyclone Ilsa (2023) – the next Category 5 tropical cyclone to make landfall on the Pilbara coast.
