= 2013–14 Australian region cyclone season =

Tropical cyclone season

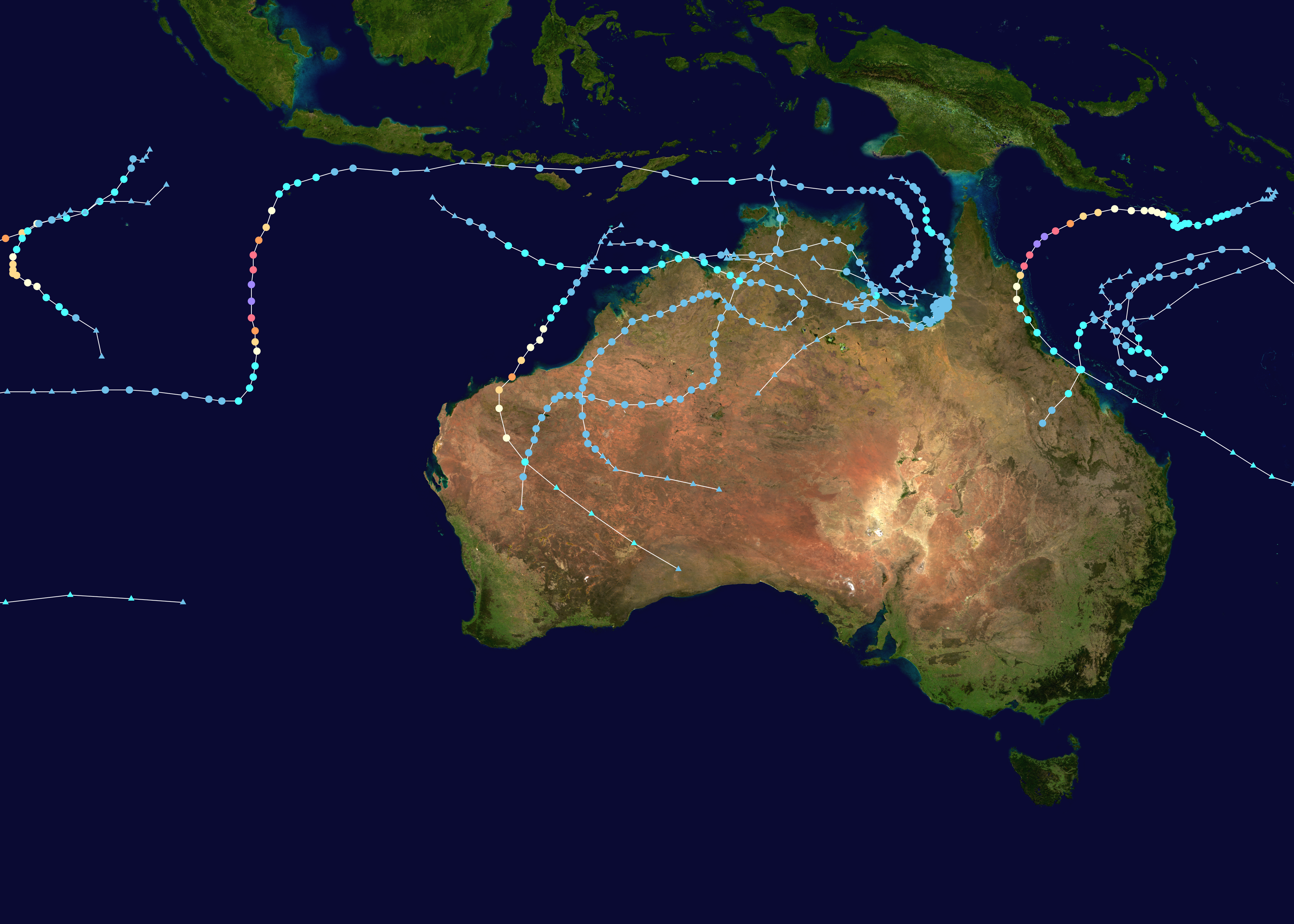
- Season summary map

Seasonal boundaries
- First system formed: 20 November 2013
- Last system dissipated: 26 April 2014

Strongest storm
- Name: Ita
  - Maximum winds: 220 km/h (140 mph) (10-minute sustained)
  - Lowest pressure: 922 hPa (mbar)

Seasonal statistics
- Tropical lows: 16
- Tropical cyclones: 10
- Severe tropical cyclones: 5
- Total fatalities: 22 total
- Total damage: $1.15 billion (2014 USD)

Related articles
- 2013–14 South-West Indian Ocean cyclone season; 2013–14 South Pacific cyclone season

The 2013–14 Australian region cyclone season was a slightly below-average tropical cyclone season, with 10 tropical cyclones occurring within the Australian region. It officially started on 1 November 2013, and ended on 30 April 2014. The regional tropical cyclone operational plan defines a "tropical cyclone year" separately from a "tropical cyclone season"; the "tropical cyclone year" began on 1 July 2013 and ended on 30 June 2014.

After two seasons with no cyclones of Category 5 intensity, this season saw two of the ten named storms reaching this level: Gillian and Ita. Of the two systems, Gillian rapidly intensified from a tropical low to a Category 5 in just 48 hours but caused only minor damage. Ita was ultimately the strongest and most intense system inside the basin and made landfall on the Far North Queensland coast near Cooktown, causing minor damage but significant flooding. In addition, significant damage was also caused by Christine in the towns of Wickham and Roebourne in Western Australia while Fletcher dumped over 1,250 mm of rainfall on the Queensland town of Kowanyama, making it the fifth-wettest tropical cyclone in the country on record.

== Seasonal forecasts ==
Region	Chance of more	Average number	Actual activity
Whole	57%	11	10
Western	53%	7	3
North-Western	55%	5	3
Northern	52%	3	3
Eastern	53%	3	3
Southern Pacific	48%	15	8
Western South Pacific	56%	8	4
Eastern South Pacific	47%	11	4
Source: BOM's Seasonal Outlooks for Tropical Cyclones.
Region	Normal number	Number predicted	Actual activity
GCACIC Whole	12-15	13	10
GCACIC Western	9-10	9	5
GCACIC Eastern	5-6	5	7
NIWA	10	9-10	10

Ahead of the cyclone season, the Australian Bureau of Meteorology (BoM), the New Zealand National Institute of Water and Atmospheric Research (NIWA) and various other Pacific Meteorological services, all contributed towards the Island Climate Update tropical cyclone outlook that was released during October 2013. The outlook took into account the ENSO neutral conditions that had been observed across the Pacific and analogue seasons with ENSO neutral conditions occurring during the season. The outlook called for a near average number of tropical cyclones for the 2013–14 season, with eight to twelve named tropical cyclones, to occur between 135°E and 120°W compared to an average of 10. At least four of the tropical cyclones were expected to become category 3 severe tropical cyclones, while three could become category 4 severe tropical cyclones, they also noted that a Category 5 severe tropical cyclone was unlikely to occur.

In addition to contributing towards the Island Climate Update outlook, the BoM issued eight seasonal forecasts during October 2013, for the Australian region and the Southern Pacific with each forecast covering the whole tropical cyclone year. Each forecast issued took into account the current neutral ENSO conditions that were forecast to continue during the season. For the basin as a whole they predicted that there was a 57% chance that the season would be near its average of around 11 tropical cyclones. For the Western region between 90°E and 125°E, the BoM forecast that the area would see activity near to or slightly below the average of 7, with a 53% chance of an above average cyclone season. TCWC Perth also noted that there was a likelihood of two tropical cyclones and a significant likelihood of at least one severe tropical cyclone impacting Western Australia.

For the North-Western subregion between 105°E and 130°E, it was predicted that activity would be near normal with a 55% chance of above average tropical cyclone activity. The Northern Territory which was defined as being between as being 125°E and 142.5°E had a 52% chance of an above average season, with TCWC Darwin noting that all of the climate drivers were pointing towards a typical tropical cyclone season for Northern Australia. The Eastern region between 142.5°E and 160°E had a 53% chance of having an above average tropical cyclone season. The BoM also issued 3 seasonal forecasts for the Southern Pacific between 142.5°E and 120°W, one for the Western Southern Pacific region between 142.5°E and 165°E and one for the Eastern Southern Pacific region between 165°E and 120°W. They noted that the tropical Pacific Ocean was currently experiencing neutral ENSO conditions which meant that there was no strong shift expected in the average location of tropical cyclone formation. They also noted that there was nothing in the broad climate drivers to suggest anything, but a typical tropical cyclone season for the South Pacific. As a result, they predicted that the region as a whole, would experience near average tropical cyclone activity during the coming season with a 48% chance of it being above average. The Western region was predicted to have 56% chance of being above average while the Eastern region had a 47% chance of being above average.

During November 2013 the Guy Carpenter Asia-Pacific Climate Impact Centre (GCACIC), issued seasonal forecasts for the whole basin and one each for the regions to the east and west of 135°E. For the overall basin they predicted that tropical cyclone activity in the entire Australian region was likely to be near normal with 13 tropical cyclones predicted to occur. However, it was suggested that the season could be below average since the region had been in an inactive era since around 2000, and two of the indicators they had used to predict the season suggested below average activity. For the Western region it was predicted that activity would be near normal with 9 tropical cyclones occurring, while the Eastern region was predicted to have 5 tropical cyclones occurring.

== Systems ==
=== Tropical Cyclone Alessia ===
- Category 1 tropical cyclone (Australian scale)
- Tropical storm (SSHWS)
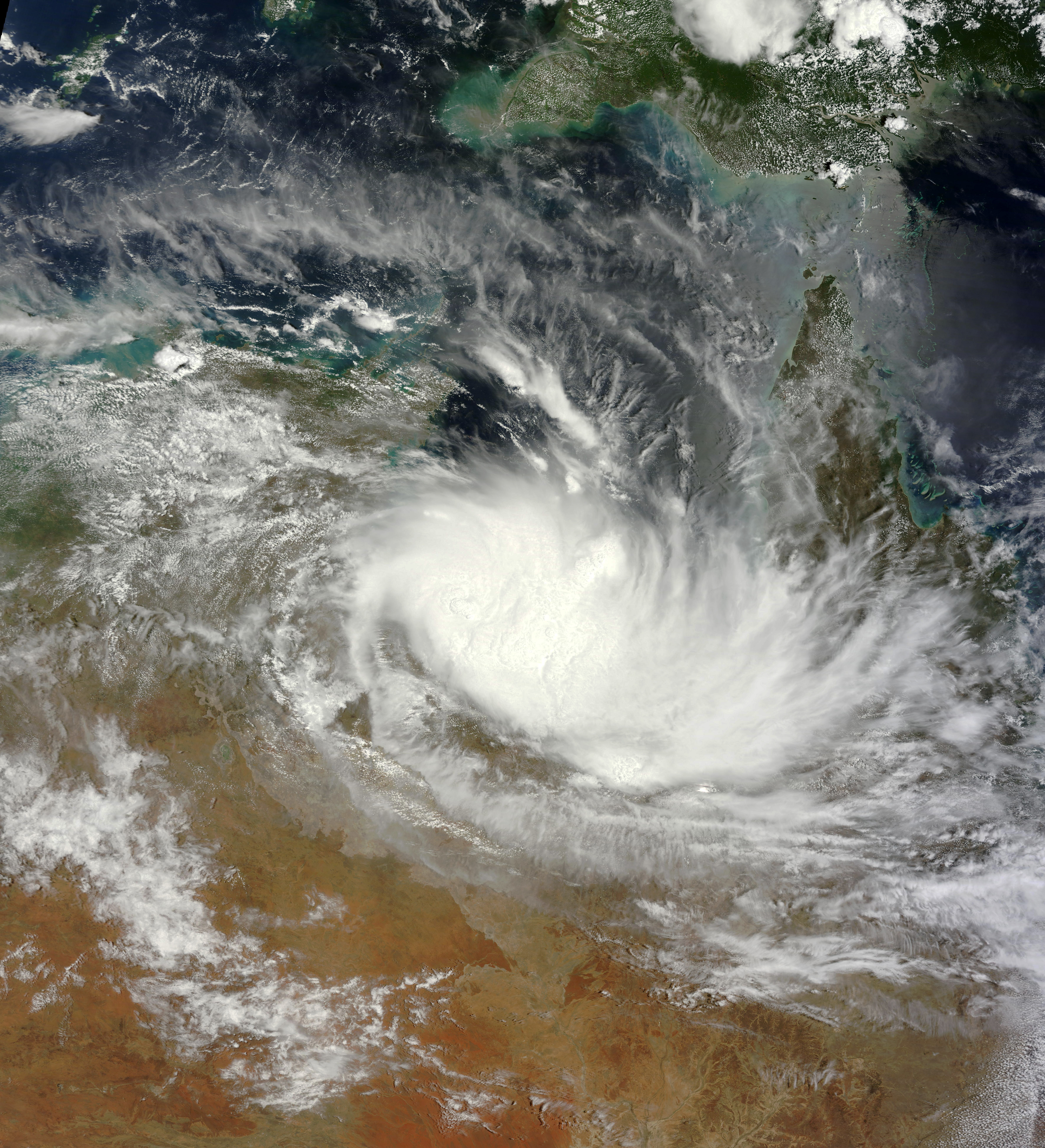
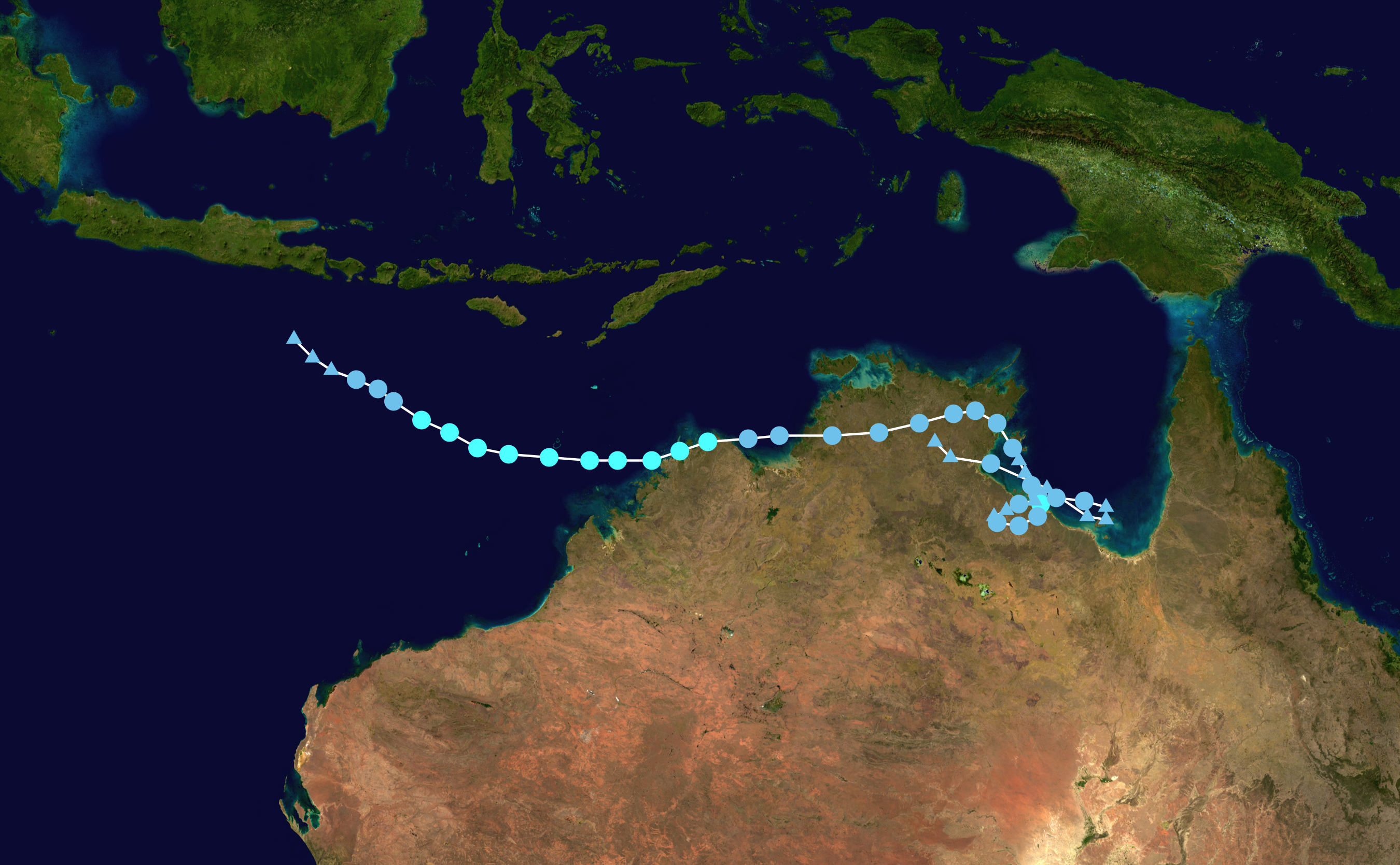
- Duration: 20 November – 1 December
- Peak intensity: 85 km/h (50 mph) (10-min); 991 hPa (mbar)

The first storm of the season originated from a developing low-pressure area south of Java in the Indian Ocean on 20 November. The system tracked southeastward, and organized only slowly due to moderate wind shear. However, at 0600 on 21 November, TCWC Perth initiated advisories on Tropical Low 01U. Over the course of the next day, the disturbance continued toward the east-southeast into an environment more conducive for further intensification, and as a result, its structure began to improve. At 0900 UTC, the JTWC designated the system Tropical Cyclone 02S, noting that the storm's center of circulation had become better-defined, with an improved convection pattern. Three hours later, the BoM upgraded the low to Category 1 Tropical Cyclone Alessia. Tracking toward the east around the southern periphery of a ridge to the north, the abnormally small cyclone approached the Kimberley coastline on 23 November.

Alessia remained a marginal Category 1 cyclone as it skirted the northern Kimberley coast, passing just south of Troughton Island before emerging into the Joseph Bonaparte Gulf. The JTWC issued its final warning on 02S at 0600 UTC on 24 November, Increased wind shear took its toll on the already disheveled cyclone, leaving the system vertically decoupled; it made its final landfall near the Anson Bay, Daly and Reynolds River Floodplains area of the Top End midday local time on 24 November. According to the BoM, Alessia deteriorated below tropical cyclone status by 1200 UTC. Alessia reformed in the Gulf of Carpentaria on 27 November, around 100 km northeast of Borroloola. During the next day, Alessia moved ashore and turned towards the east. On 28 November, Alessia weakened below tropical cyclone intensity again, and turned towards the west again. On 29 November, Alessia completed a loop and re-entered the Gulf of Carpentaria. During the next several days, Alessia turned back towards the east, while continuing to weaken. On 1 December, Alessia moved over land once again, as the system continued moving westwards. Early on 2 December, Alessia was dropped from TCWC Perth's Tropical Weather Outlook, as the system dissipated.

Rainfall was unusually light for even a weak tropical cyclone, with no major rain totals after Alessia's first landfall. Rainfall in the Gulf of Carpentaria was heavier, Centre Island recorded 290.4 mm (11.43 in), the McArthur River Mine 172.2 mm (6.78 in) and Borroloola 88.6 mm (3.49 in).

=== Severe Tropical Cyclone Bruce ===
- Category 3 severe tropical cyclone (Australian scale)
- Category 3 tropical cyclone (SSHWS)
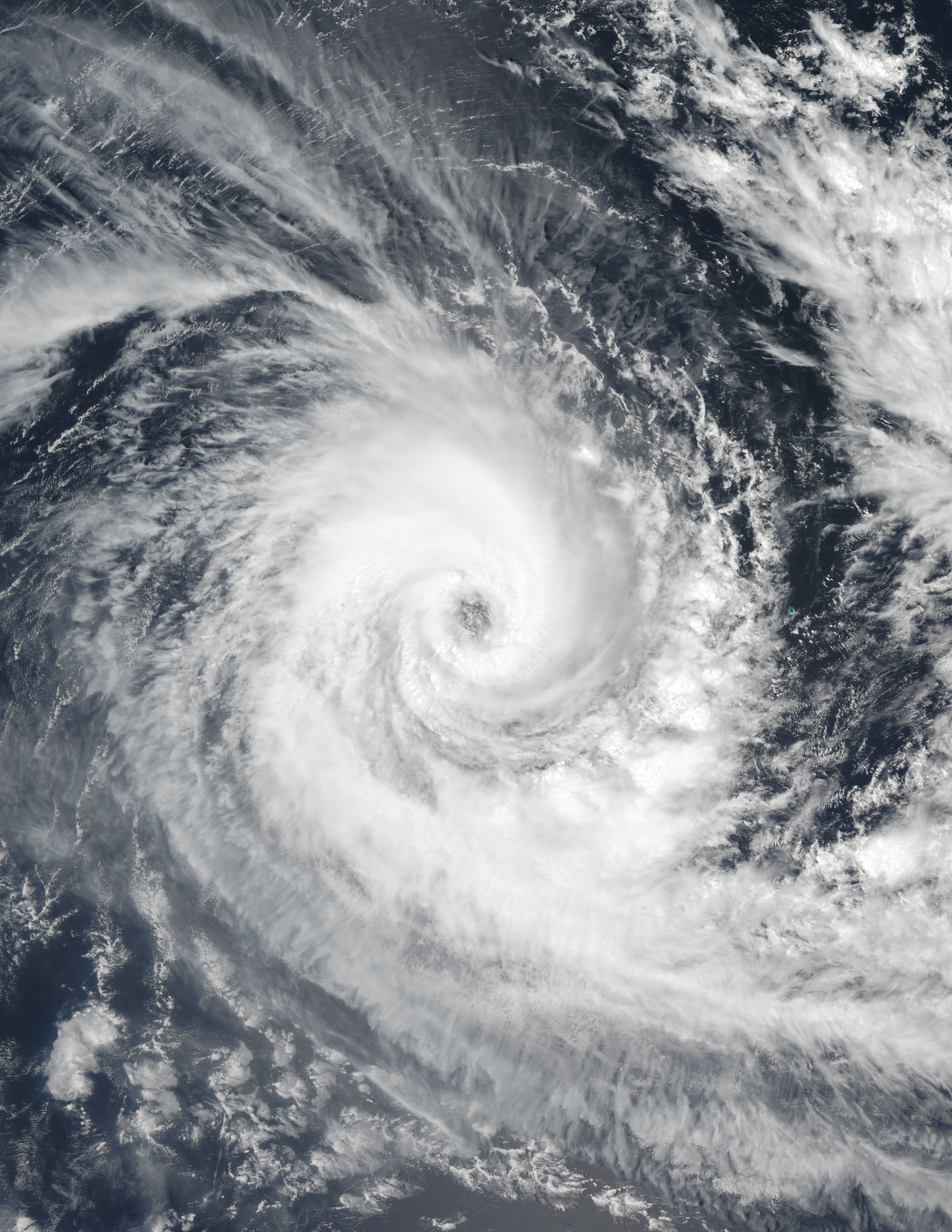
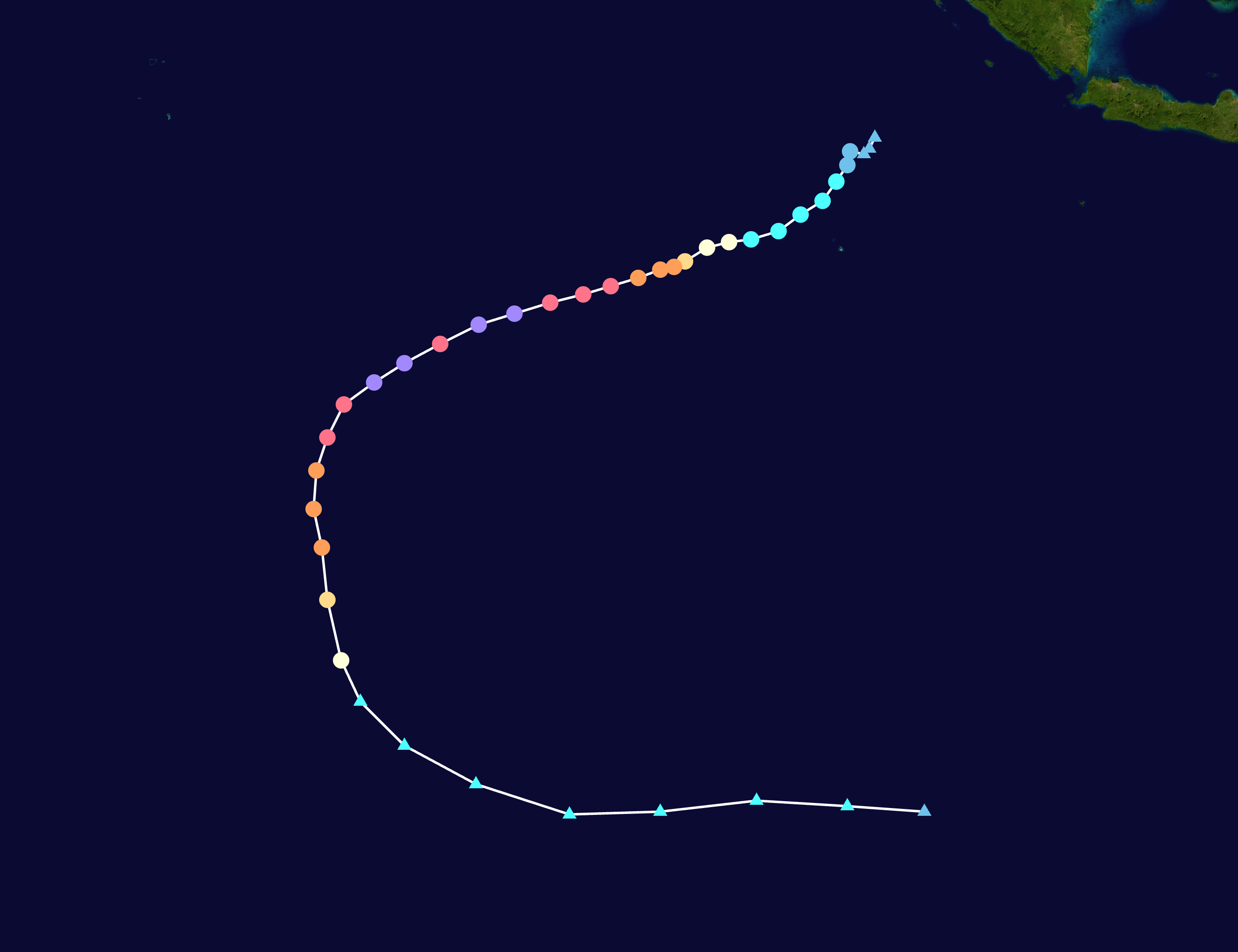
- Duration: 16 December – 19 December (Exited basin)
- Peak intensity: 155 km/h (100 mph) (10-min); 959 hPa (mbar)

In mid-December 2013, an active monsoon trough became established over the eastern Indian Ocean, near southwestern Indonesia. By 15 December, an area of low pressure developed about 535 km (330 mi) northeast of the Cocos Islands. Scatterometer passes revealed a well-defined circulation while satellite imagery showed fragmented convective banding features wrapping into the system. Situated to the north of a subtropical ridge, favorable diffluence supported convective development; however, concurrent moderate to high wind shear mitigated this. On 16 December, the BOM began monitoring the system as a tropical low, assigning it the identifier 03U. Tracking generally southwest over the following day, deep convection became increasingly organized around the centre of circulation and banding features steadily improved. Owing to this development, the JTWC issued a Tropical Cyclone Formation Alert. Environmental conditions improved markedly by 17 December, with wind shear lessening and excellent outflow into an upper-level low over Western Australia developing. Around 1800 UTC that day, the JTWC issued their first advisory on the system, designating it Tropical Cyclone 04S.

Early on 18 December, the BOM upgraded the low to a tropical cyclone and assigned it the name Bruce. At this time, Bruce was situated roughly 210 km (130 mi) north of the Cocos Islands. Near-gale-force winds were reported on the island despite its distance, indicating stronger winds were likely near its center. Maintaining a general southwest to west-southwest track along the subtropical ridge, Bruce steadily intensified. Increasingly rapid development took place later that day as the storm passed roughly 200 km (120 mi) northwest of the Cocos Islands. Periodic gale-force winds and heavy rains impacted the Cocos Islands; a peak gust of 91 km/h (57 mph) was measured on 18 December while gusts up to 67 km/h (42 mph) continued into the following day. During the same period, a total of 114 mm (4.5 in) of rain fell. No damage was reported in relation to the storm. With elevated oceanic heat content in the storm's path, Bruce attained severe tropical cyclone status — having sustained winds of at least 120 km/h (75 mph) — early on 19 December. A broad, ragged eye feature became apparent on visible satellite imagery that day, and deep convection soon consolidated around the eyewall. Around 1800 UTC, the cyclone crossed 90°E, leaving the BOM's area of responsibility and entering that of Météo-France. At this time, Bruce was estimated to be a high-end Category 3 on the Australian intensity scale with winds of 155 km/h (95 mph) and a barometric pressure of 961 mbar (hPa; 28.38 inHg). On 25 December, the remnants of Bruce re-entered the Australian region basin.

=== Severe Tropical Cyclone Christine ===
- Category 4 severe tropical cyclone (Australian scale)
- Category 3 tropical cyclone (SSHWS)
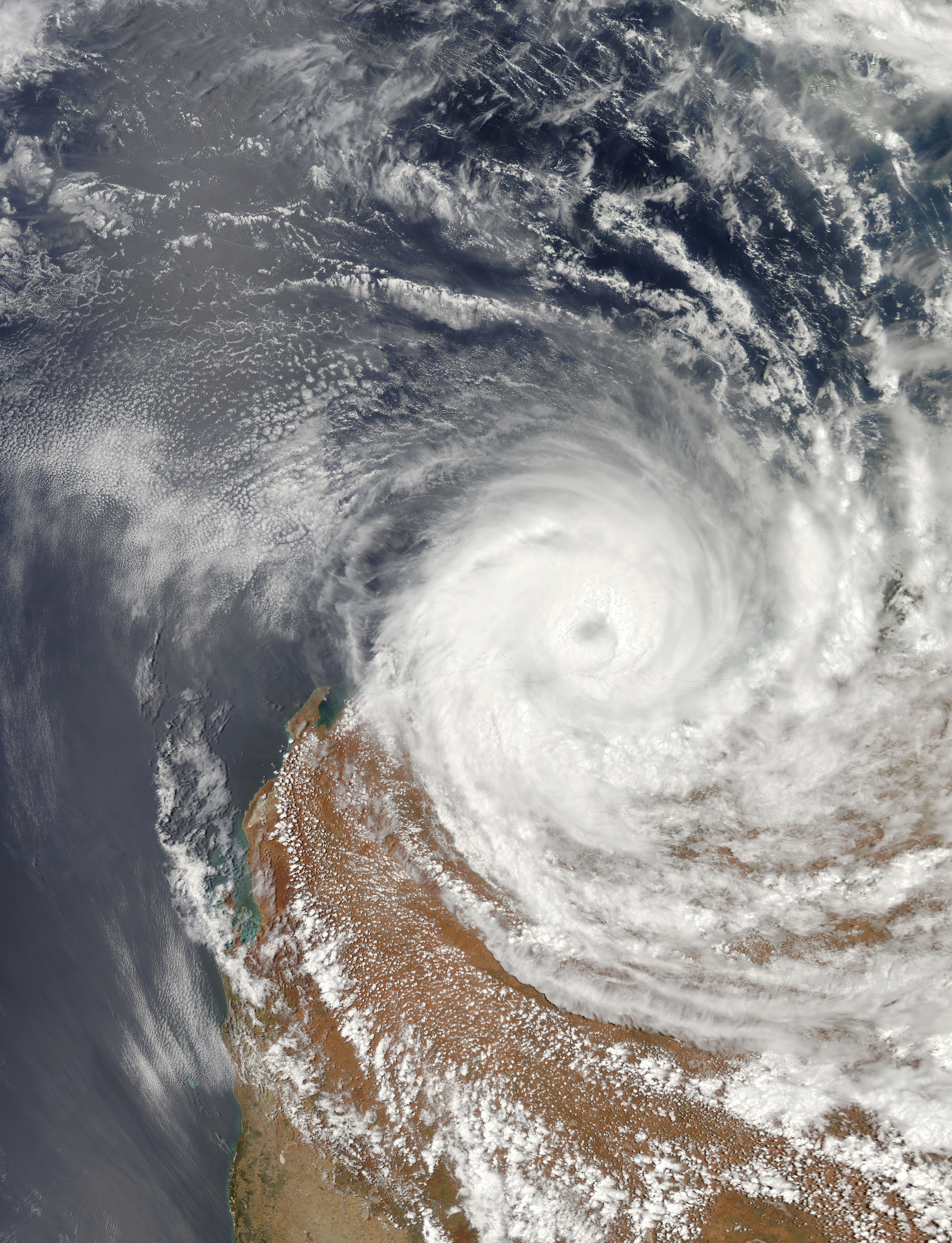
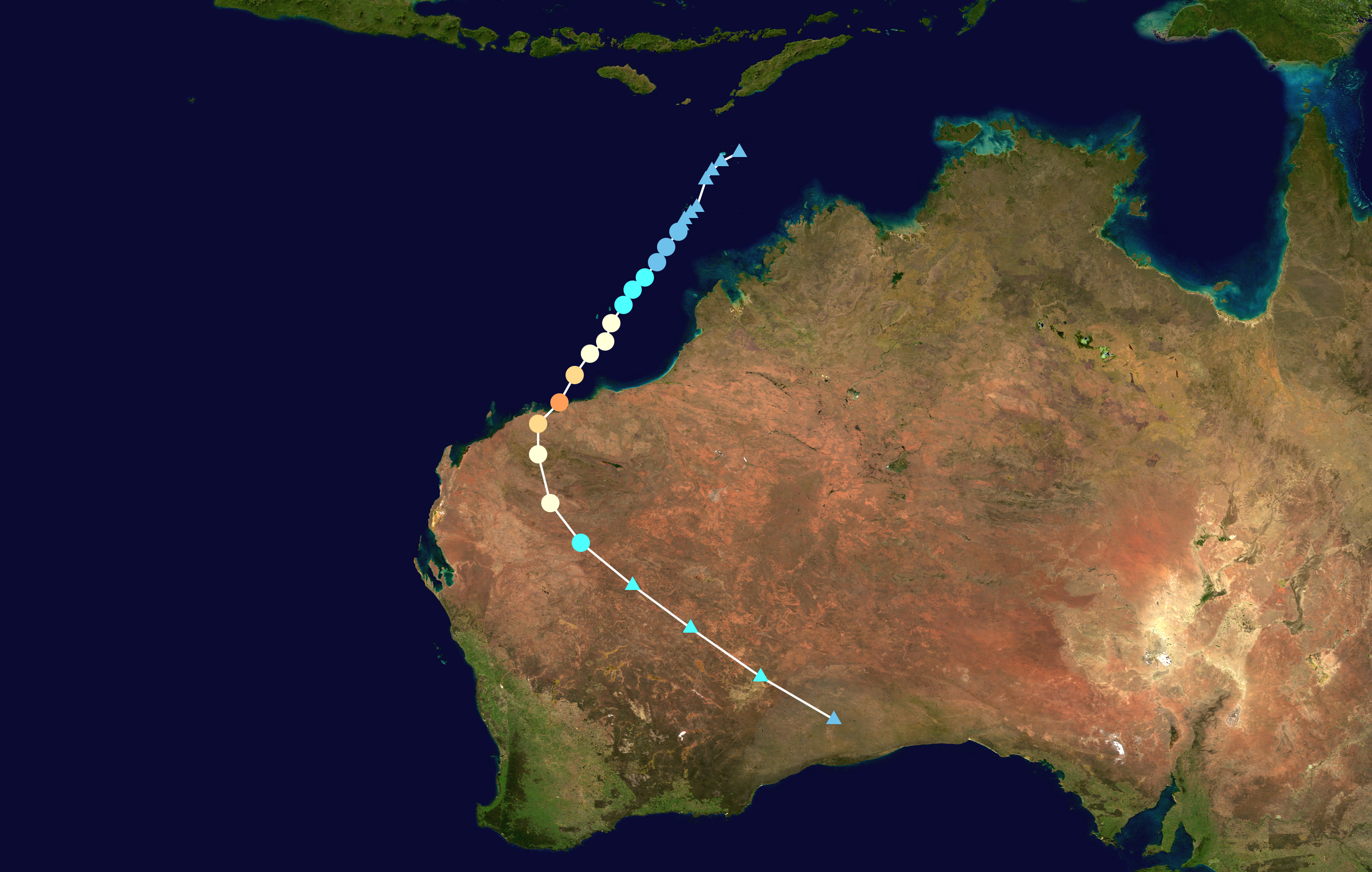
- Duration: 22 December – 1 January
- Peak intensity: 165 km/h (105 mph) (10-min); 948 hPa (mbar)

On 25 December, TCWC Perth started to monitor a discrete center, that had developed within the broad monsoon circulation. Over the next couple of days the system intensified further and became a tropical cyclone on 28 December, gaining the name Christine. It intensified overnight and was upgraded to Category 2 status by the Bureau of Meteorology, before intensifying into a Category 4 system.

On 30 December, Christine made landfall near Port Hedland, directly between Roebourne and Whim Creek. The name Christine was retired and was replaced to Catherine.

=== Tropical Low 05U ===
- Tropical low (Australian scale)
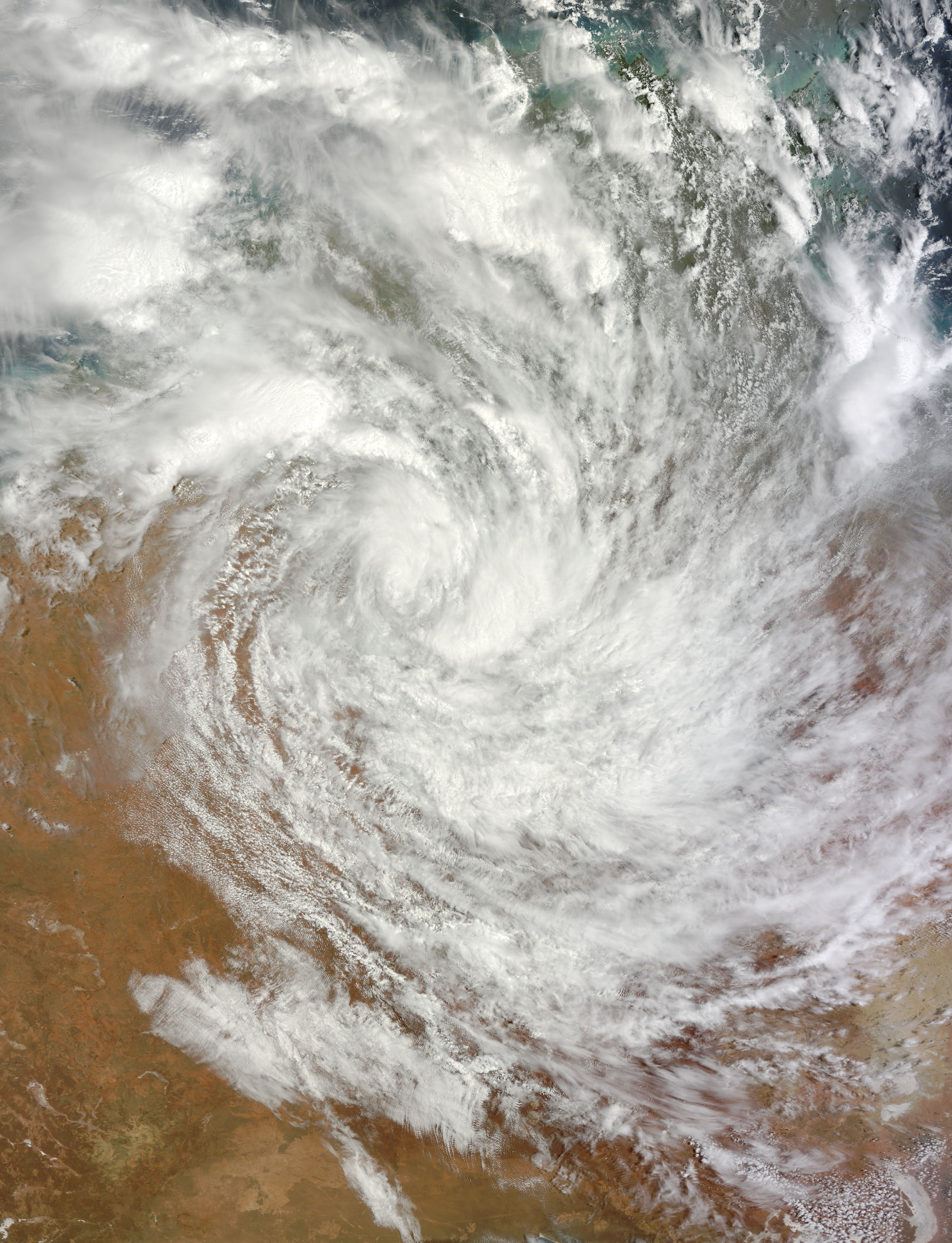
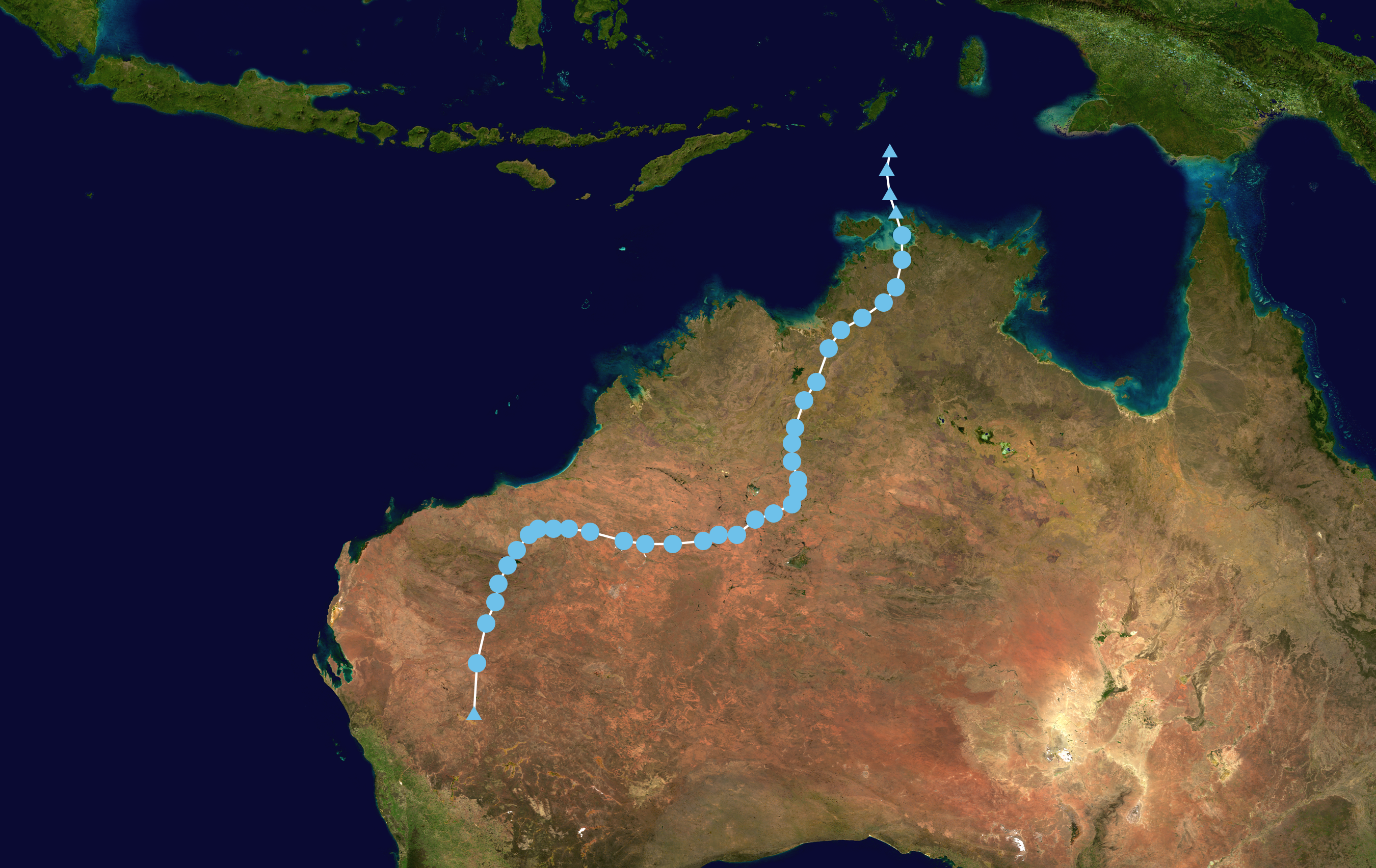
- Duration: 10 January – 23 January
- Peak intensity: Winds not specified; 989 hPa (mbar)

On 10 January, TCWC Darwin reported that a weak tropical low had formed in the Arafura Sea north of the Arnhem Land. The low remained stationary on 11 January and continued to maintain its intensity. On 13 January, TCWC Darwin issued warnings for the coast of Northern Territory. The tropical low crossed the coast early on 14 January east of Darwin and moved inland.

As the low moved south-west, it caused significant rainfall across vast swathes of inland Australia. Several sites in the Northern Territory and Western Australia registered record rainfall totals, causing flooding in many areas. Rabbit Flat in the Northern Territory received a record 330.6 mm (13.02 in) over a three-day period, while Lajamanu recorded 208.0 mm (8.19 in). Over the border in Western Australia, Halls Creek received 260.4 mm (10.25 in) and Australia's hottest town Marble Bar, 167.6 mm (6.60 in). Mines in the Alice Springs district were isolated by floodwaters, while at Fitzroy Crossing, the Fitzroy River burst its banks, stranding tourists and locals alike. In the Mid West region of Western Australia, cattle stations were inundated with flood waters and some damage to farming infrastructure was reported. Overall however, rains were beneficial over north-west Australia, alleviating drought conditions, particularly in the Northern Territory.

The tropical low was forecast to dissipate by 22 January, however, the system continued moving into the southern region of Western Australia, dropping very heavy rain along the way. Kalgoorlie recorded 103.0 mm (4.06 in) in 24 hours, while the town of Leonora received 146.2 mm (5.76 in) over a two-day span. Parts of the arid Nullarbor Plain received more than an entire summer's worth of rain in 24 hours, Eyre received 106.5 mm (4.19 in), Forrest 48.0 mm (1.89 in) and Cook 31.2 mm (1.23 in).

=== Tropical Cyclone Dylan ===
- Category 2 tropical cyclone (Australian scale)
- Tropical storm (SSHWS)
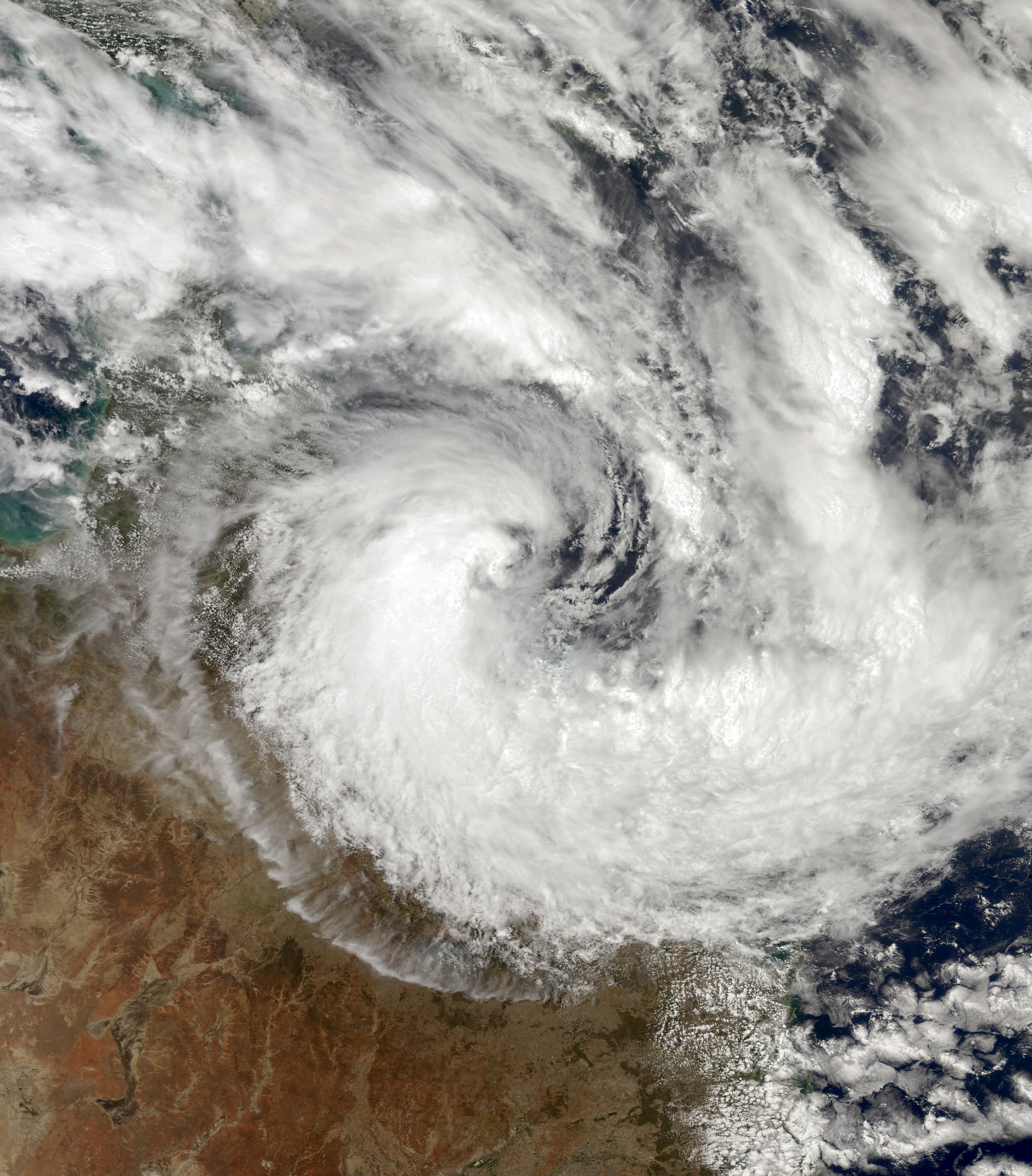
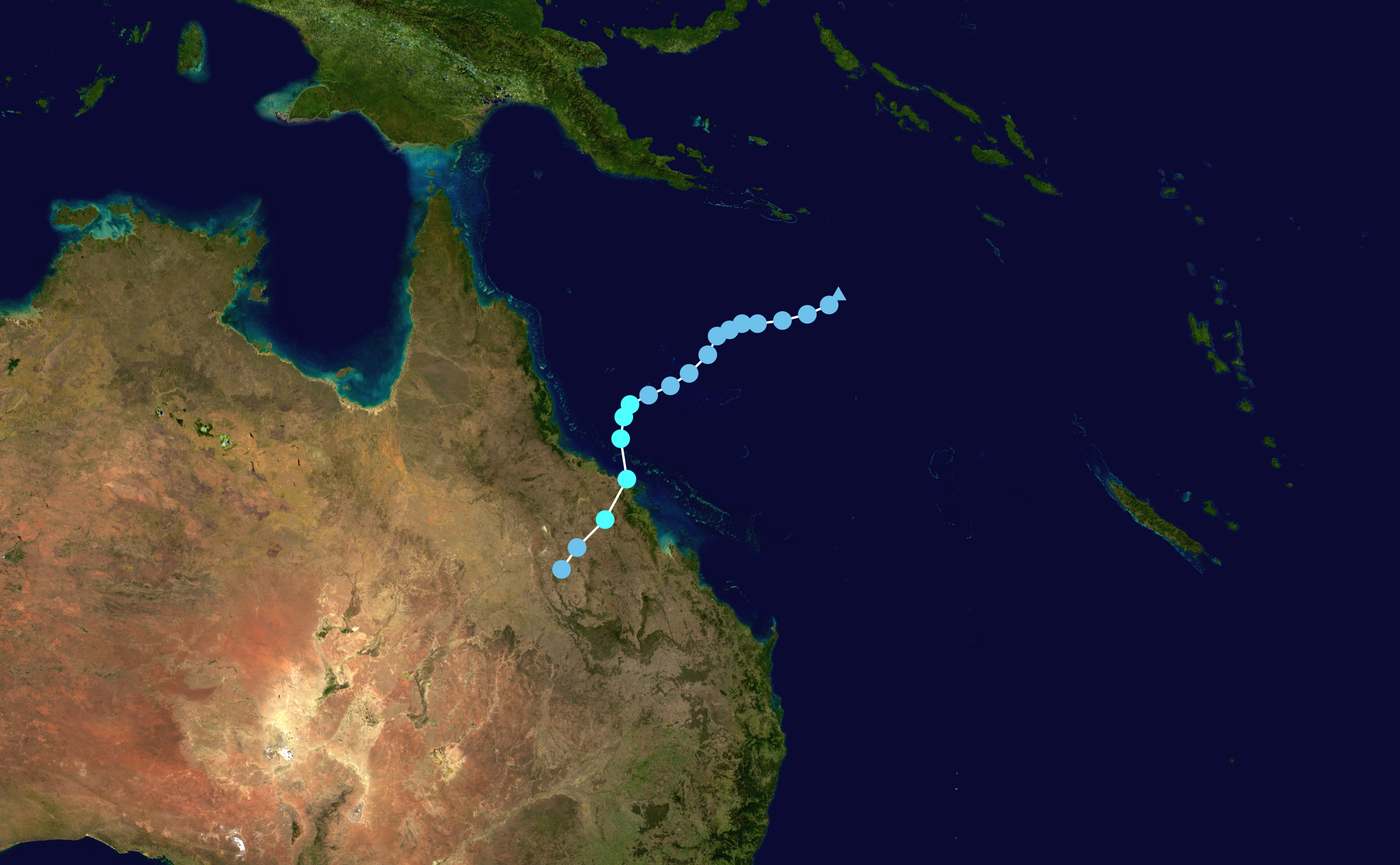
- Duration: 24 January – 31 January
- Peak intensity: 110 km/h (70 mph) (10-min); 978 hPa (mbar)

On 24 January, TCWC Brisbane reported that the remnants of Tropical Disturbance 10F had moved into the Australian region. Over the next two days, the system remained stationary south of the Solomon Islands. On 27 January, it was upgraded to a monsoon low, as it slowly began to move south east. On 28 January, the system began to exhibit strong convective banding and low wind shear combined with favourable sea surface temperatures caused the JTWC to forecast rapid intensification of the system. However this did not occur due to dry air located in the southern Coral Sea, hindering the system's development as it continued to move south-east at around 10 km/h (6.2 mph). By late 28 January, a cyclone watch was declared by the Bureau of Meteorology for areas between Port Douglas and Proserpine. By 29 January, the low accelerated south-eastward slightly and continued intensifying, albeit slowly. Sea surface temperatures of 28 °C (82 °F) assisted in the system's development and by 30 January, it reached tropical cyclone strength and was named Dylan by the BOM. Dylan began to shift south south-east, and a cyclone warning by the BOM was shifted south accordingly as Dylan continued to intensify. Late on 30 January, Dylan reached category 2 status while located 185 km (115 mi) north-east of Townsville and was forecast to make landfall near Bowen within 12 hours. Dylan made landfall on the Queensland coast between Bowen and Proserpine at around 3:30 am on 31 January, with the eye of the cyclone passing over the small town of Dingo Beach. In doing so, Dylan became the first cyclone to hit the coast of Eastern Queensland since Yasi in 2011. Dylan quickly weakened to below cyclone status after moving over land and was dropped from all advisories by the Bureau of Meteorology and TCWC Brisbane while located near Moranbah as it was classified as a remnant low.

Despite making landfall on a heavily populated region of the Queensland coast, damage was minimal and mainly restricted to minor flooding associated with king tides. Several houses in Townsville and Mackay sustained minor damage from seawater inundation associated with unusually high tides, while a beachside resort on Great Keppel Island sustained severe damage to many structures after the beach gave way, washing several buildings into the sea. Rainfall was minimal for a slow moving tropical cyclone and mainly restricted to the southern cloud mass of Dylan. Proserpine received 190.6 mm (7.50 in), St Lawrence 128.0 mm (5.04 in) and Mackay 108.4 mm (4.27 in). Despite being only 25 km (16 mi) away from Dylan's eyewall, Bowen only received 56.0 mm (2.20 in) of rain, while Yeppoon, almost 500 km (310 mi) away from the cyclone's eye received 136.6 mm (5.38 in) and Rockhampton recorded 229.6 mm (9.04 in) from thunderstorms associated with Dylan's outer rainbands. Despite moderate to heavy rainfall totals, no flooding was recorded as the weather had been extremely dry in the few months prior to Dylan's landfall, and most of Queensland still remained in severe drought.

=== Tropical Low Fletcher ===
- Tropical low (Australian scale)
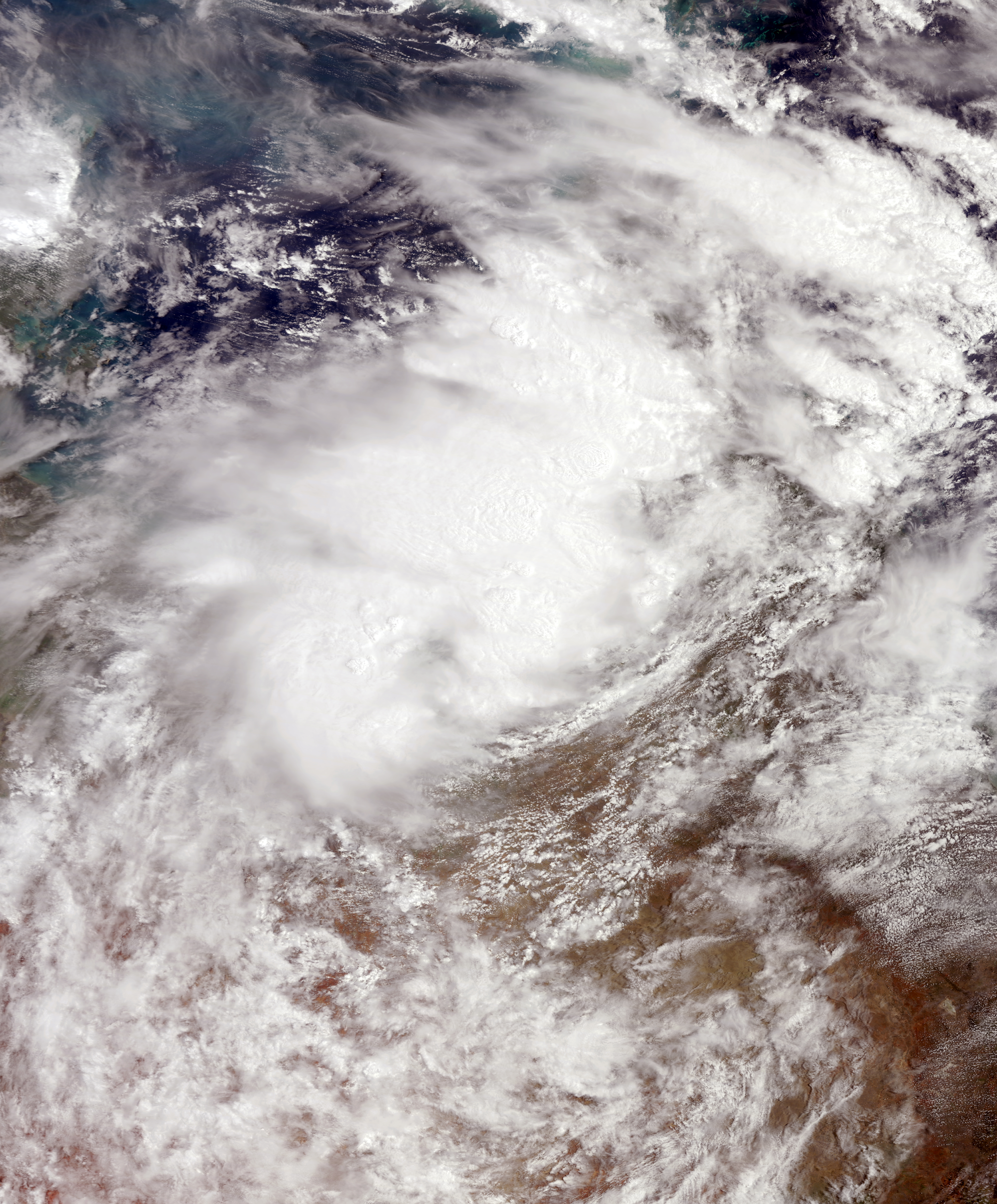
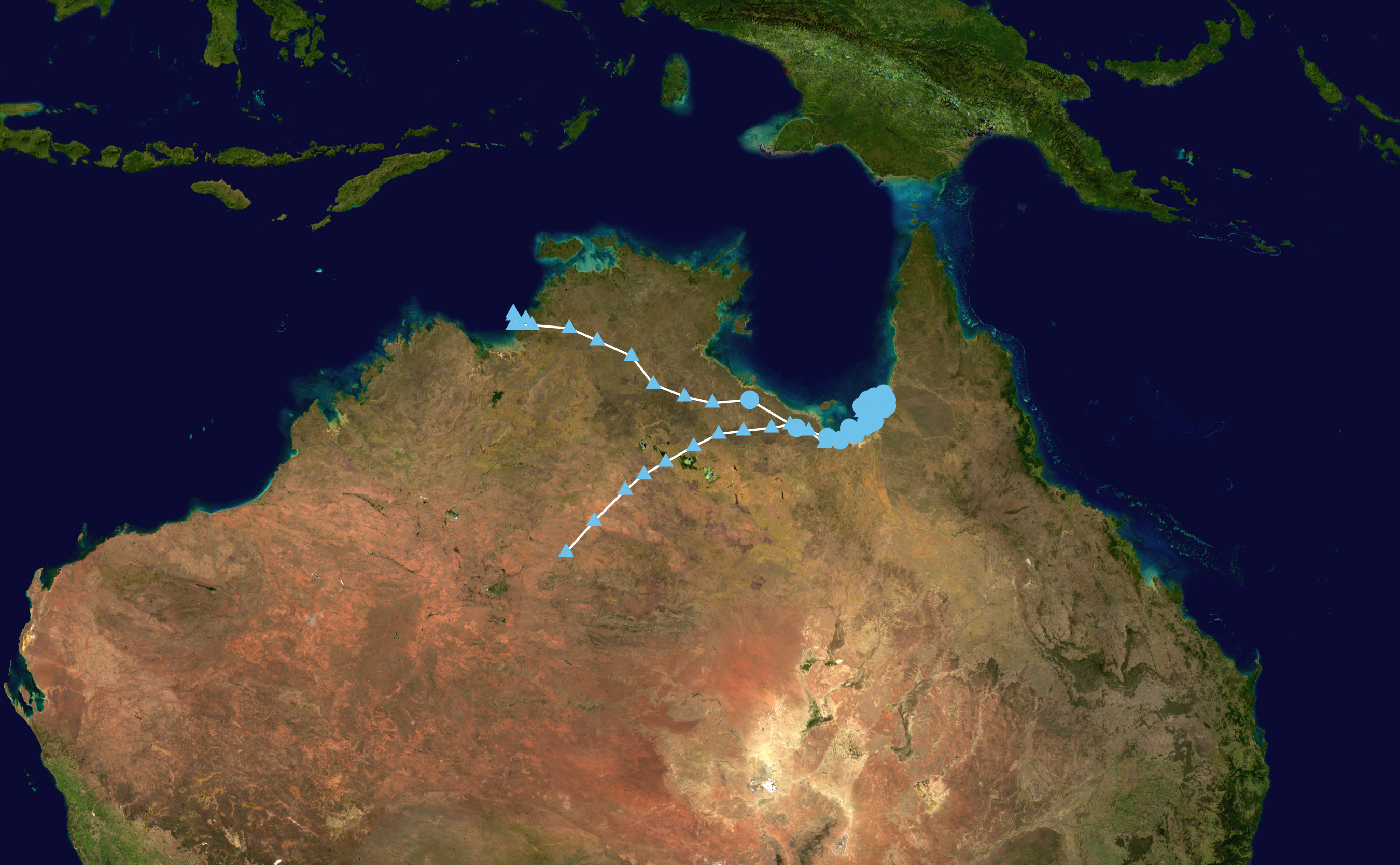
- Duration: 30 January – 12 February
- Peak intensity: 65 km/h (40 mph) (10-min); 992 hPa (mbar)

On 30 January, TCWC Darwin reported that Tropical Low 08U had developed within the Timor Sea. During the next day the system moved over the Northern Territory and subsequently moved towards the east-southeast. Over the next couple of days while the system was over land it maintained its structure, before it moved over the waters of the Gulf of Carpentaria during 2 February. It subsequently strengthened into a category 1 cyclone, the Bureau naming it Fletcher. Winds reached its highest speeds of roughly 40 miles per hour but subsequently settled.

In the best track data post-analysis of the storm, Fletcher was not deemed to have acquired gale-force winds more than halfway around the centre, and was downgraded to a tropical low.

=== Tropical Cyclone Edna ===
- Category 1 tropical cyclone (Australian scale)
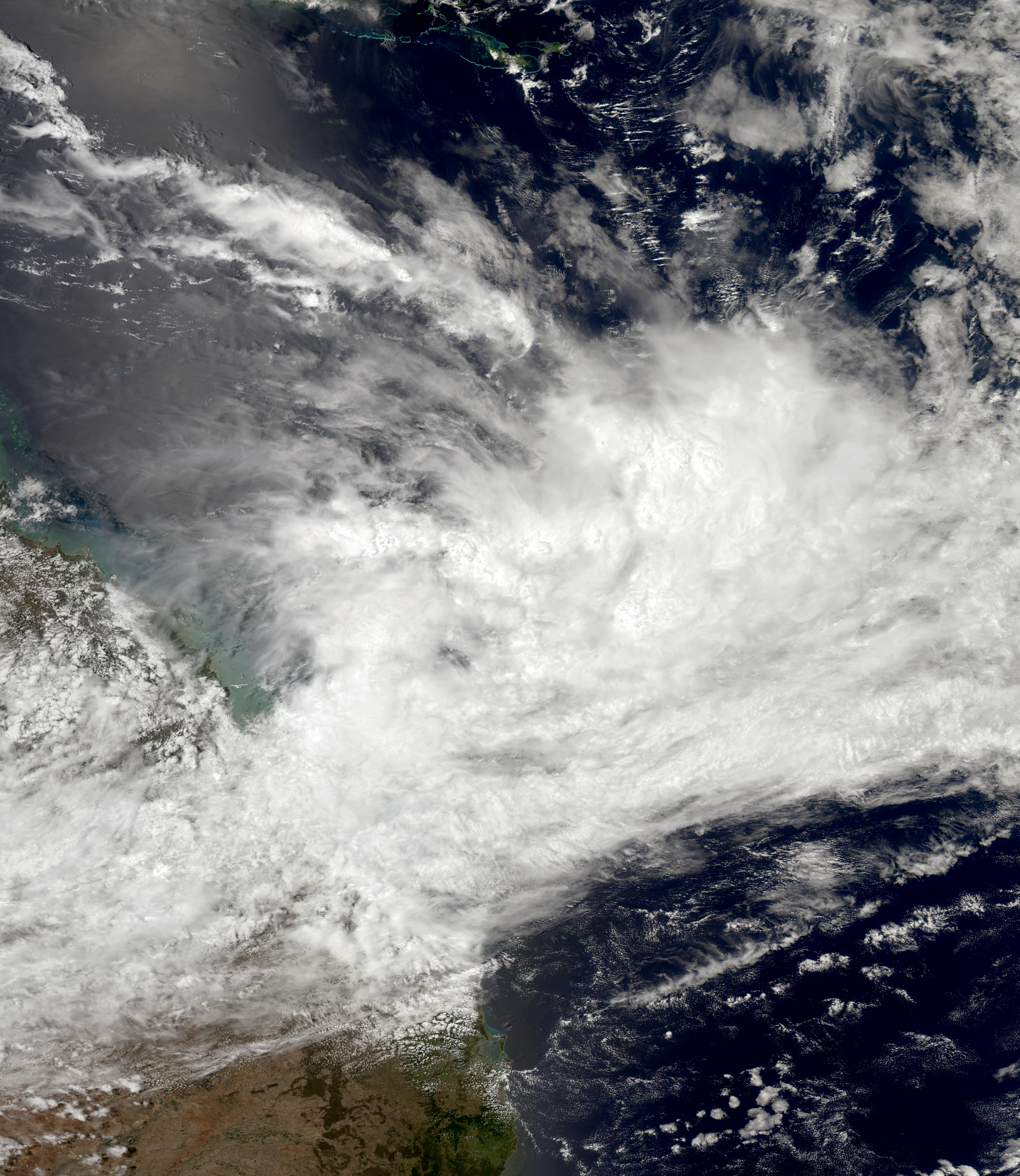
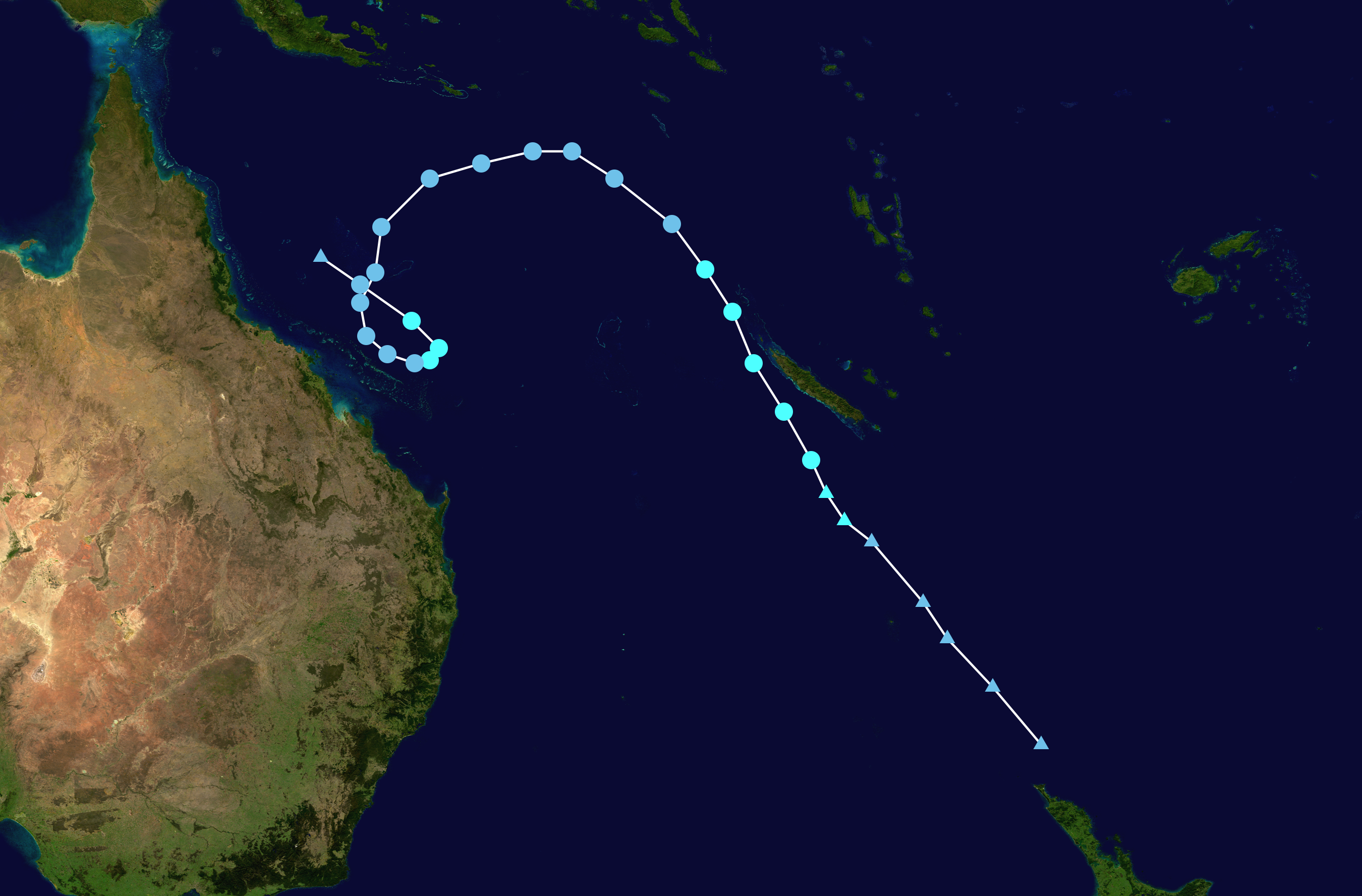
- Duration: 31 January – 4 February (Exited basin)
- Peak intensity: 75 km/h (45 mph) (10-min); 994 hPa (mbar)

During 31 January TCWC Brisbane started to monitor a tropical low that had developed within the monsoon trough, over the central Coral Sea about 400 km (250 mi) to the northeast of Mackay in Queensland, Australia. Over the next few hours the system moved south-eastwards and rapidly developed further in an area of low vertical wind shear, while remaining offshore and producing gale-force winds for around 3 hours at Marion Reef. As a result of these gale-force winds and a microwave image which showed atmospheric convection wrapping around the system's centre, TCWC Brisbane reported that the system had intensified into a category 1 tropical cyclone and named it Edna. The system subsequently started to weaken as increased vertical wind shear associated with an upper-level trough affected the system, before it weakened below tropical cyclone intensity later that day. Over the next few days the remnant tropical low moved towards the northwest, before it turned and moved towards the north-northeast and the South Pacific basin, under the influence of a large stationary upper trough over the Coral Sea. The system subsequently redeveloped into a Category 1 tropical cyclone, as it crossed 160°E and moved into the South Pacific basin, where it impacted the French Territory of New Caledonia.

=== Tropical Cyclone 09U ===
- Category 2 tropical cyclone (Australian scale)
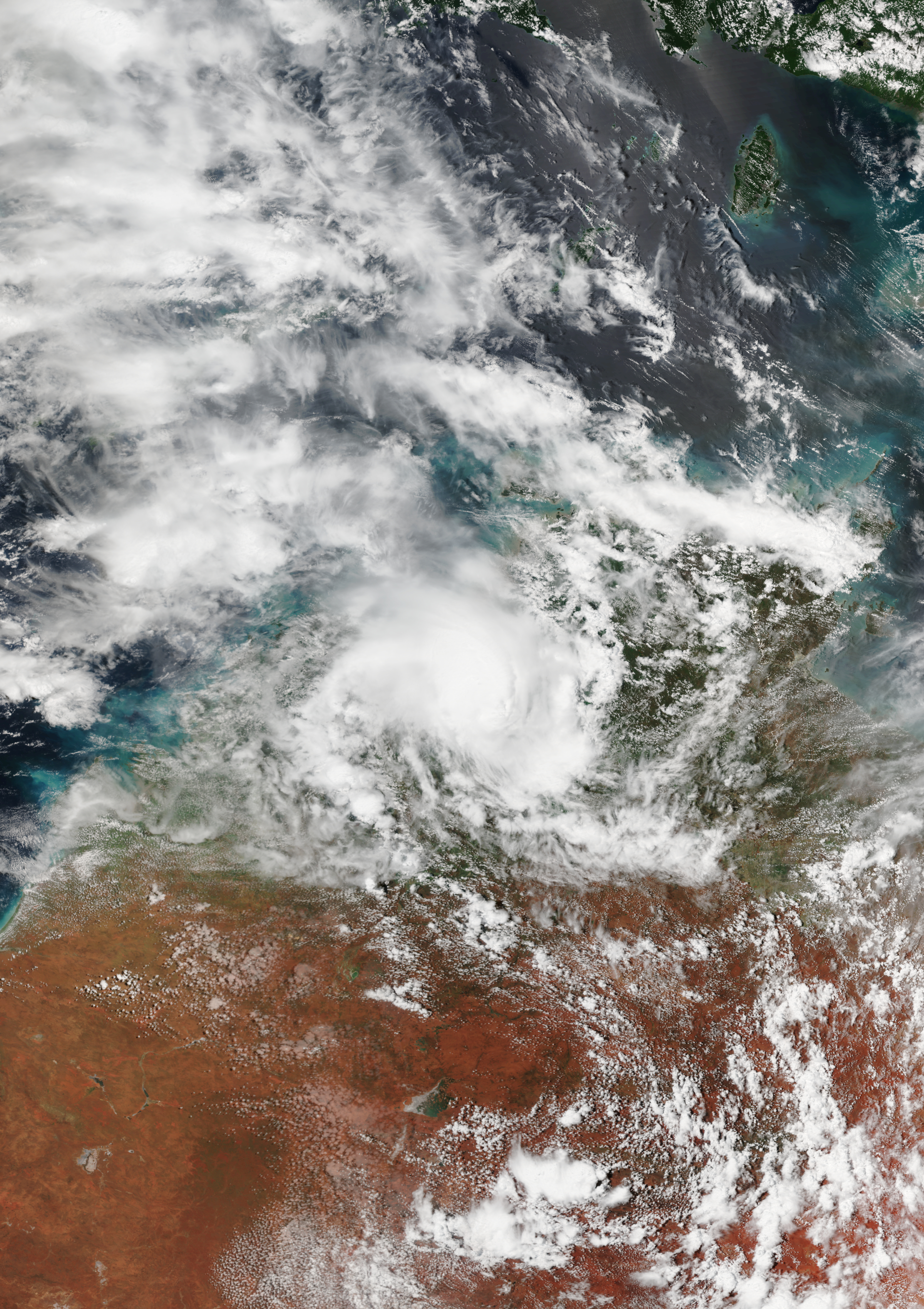
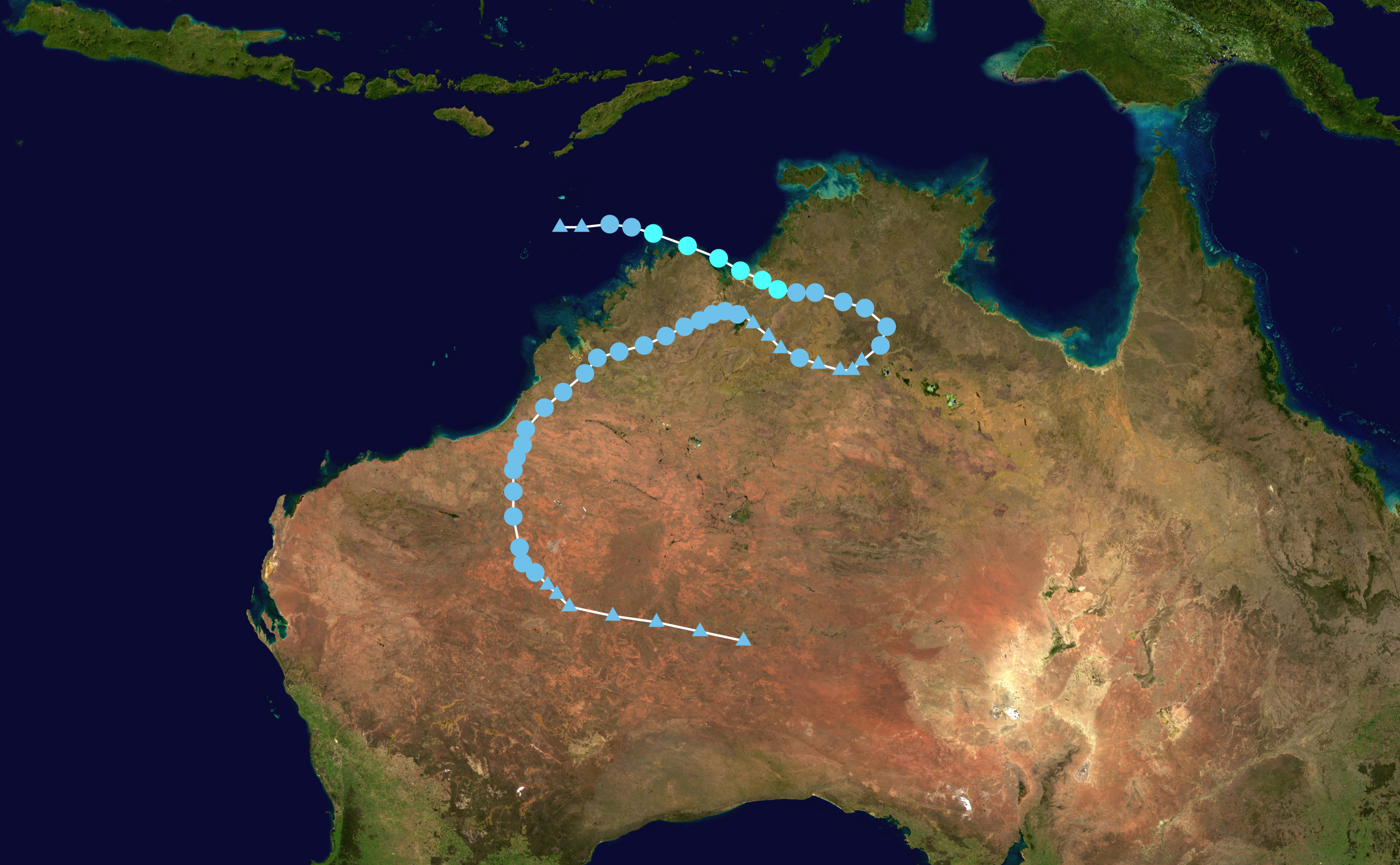
- Duration: 31 January – 13 February
- Peak intensity: 100 km/h (65 mph) (10-min); 984 hPa (mbar)

On 2 February the BoM reported that Tropical Low 09U had developed, to the north of the Kimberley coast. Over the next day the system moved east-southeast and crossed the coast of the Northern Territory near Wadeye about 250 km (155 mi) to the south of Darwin. Over the next couple of days the low moved eastwards, before it was steered back westwards. During 8 February the BoM started issuing tropical cyclone advisories on the system while it was located near Argyle, as there was a significant risk that the well-structured low could move over open water and rapidly develop into a tropical cyclone. However, over the next couple of days the system started moving southwards over land and did not move over open water as predicted, with the tropical cyclone advisories cancelled as a result on 10 February. The system subsequently moved eastwards, before it was last noted as it weakened during 13 February to the east of Carnegie. After a careful reanalysis of the system's track data and observations, it was decided that the system had developed into a Category 1 tropical cyclone before crossing the coast during 3 February.

As the system moved through parts of the Northern Territory, Northern and Central parts of Western Australia, it produced strong to squally winds, heavy rainfall and flooding. Within the Northern Territory, heavy rainfall over several days in association with the system, exacerbated existing flooding over the Darwin-Daly district and extended it into the Victoria River. Several trees and power lines were brought down by the squally winds in Wadeye. Within the Kimberley some flood damage was recorded with 20 homes in the town of Kununurra in the north Kimberley affected.

=== Tropical Cyclone Hadi ===
- Category 1 tropical cyclone (Australian scale)
- Tropical storm (SSHWS)
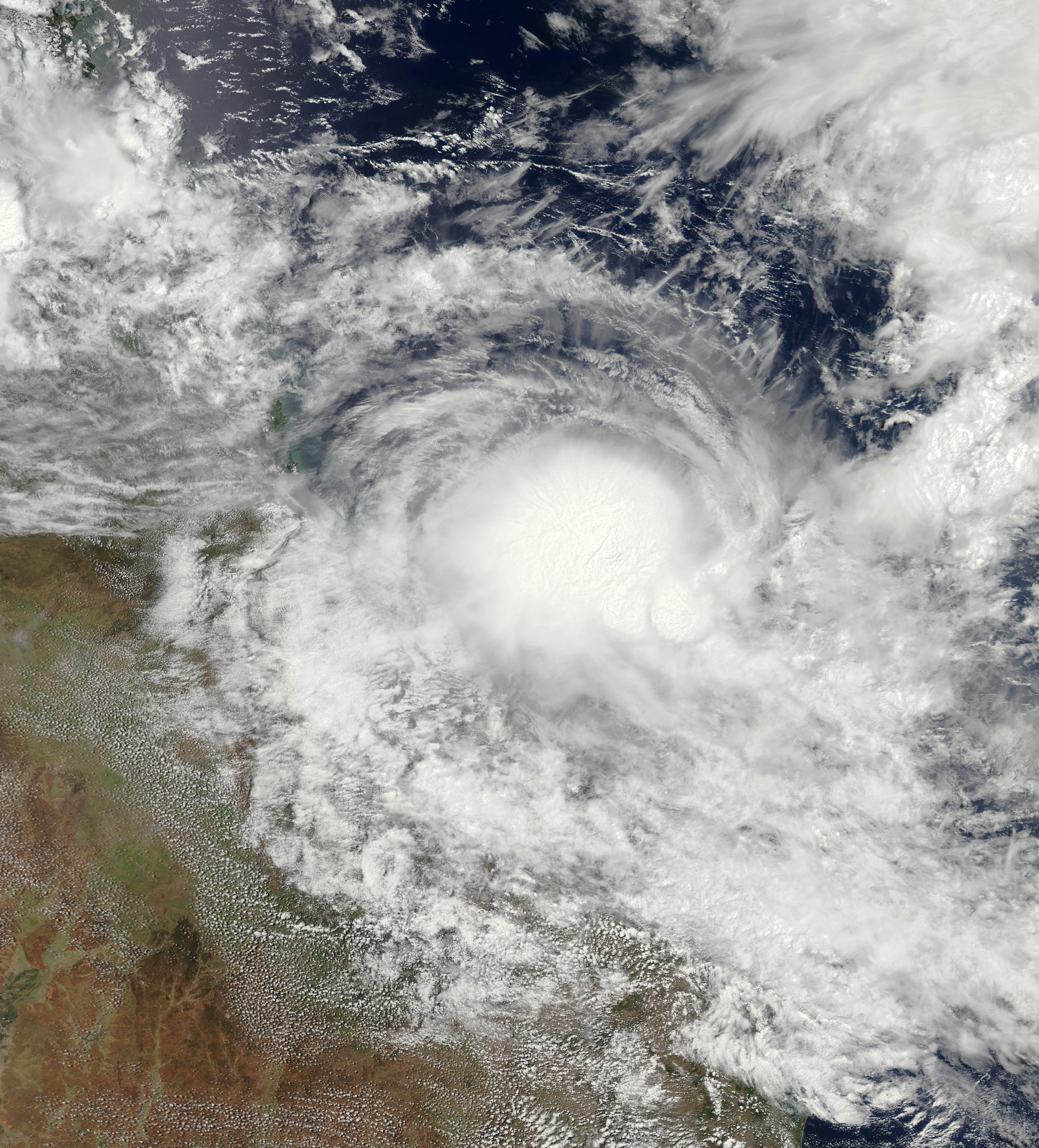
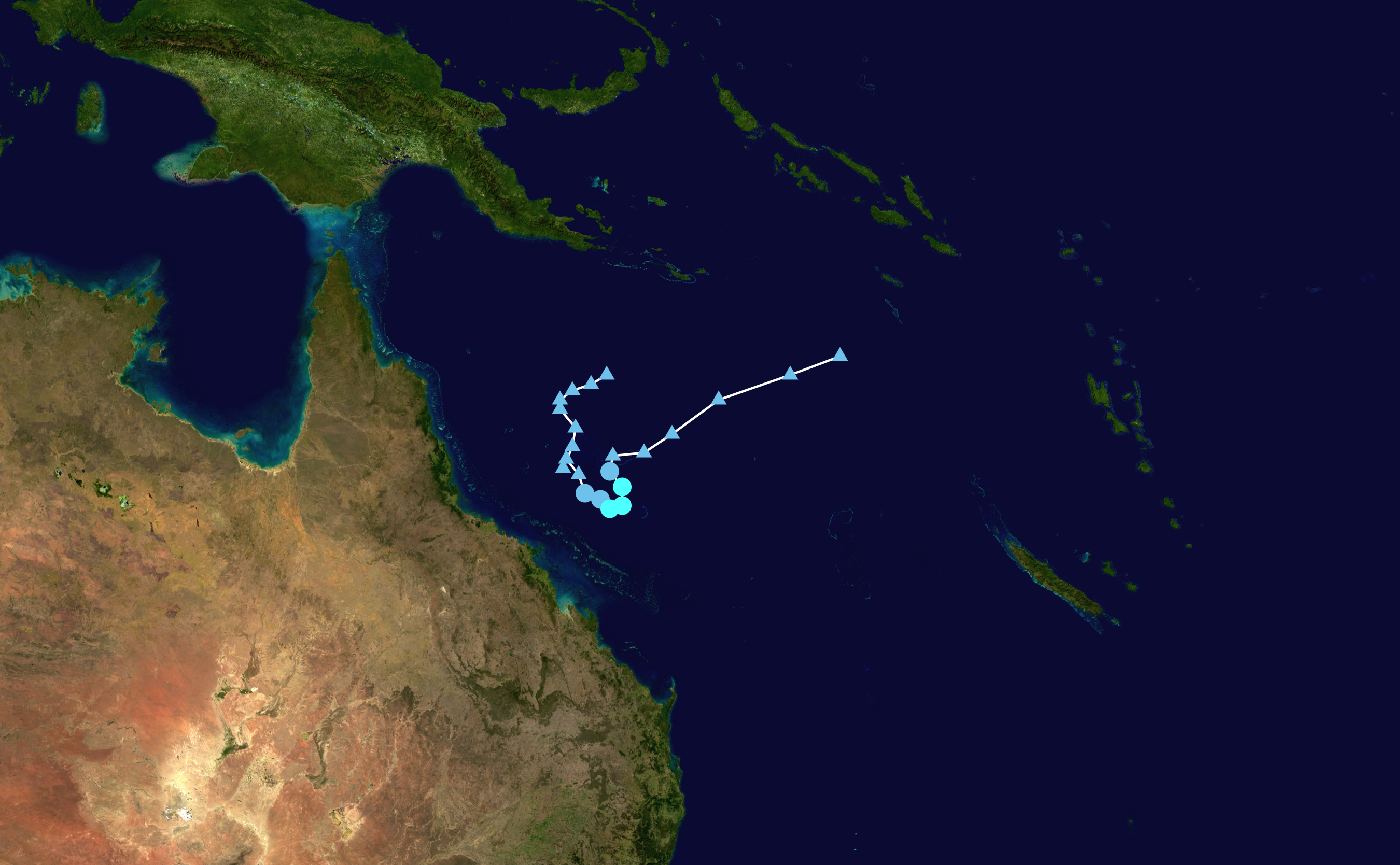
- Duration: 28 February (Entered basin) – 20 March
- Peak intensity: 75 km/h (45 mph) (10-min); 992 hPa (mbar)

On 27 February, Tropical Disturbance 16F entered the basin. It slowly organized and was designated 13U late on 7 March. Two days later, the BoM upgraded it to a Category 1 tropical cyclone, naming it Hadi. Hadi then weakened moving east on 11 March. During the next day, Hadi re-entered the South Pacific basin and was designated as Tropical Disturbance 20F. On 18 March, the system re-entered the BoM's area of responsibility, before dissipating on 20 March.

=== Severe Tropical Cyclone Gillian ===
- Category 5 severe tropical cyclone (Australian scale)
- Category 5 tropical cyclone (SSHWS)
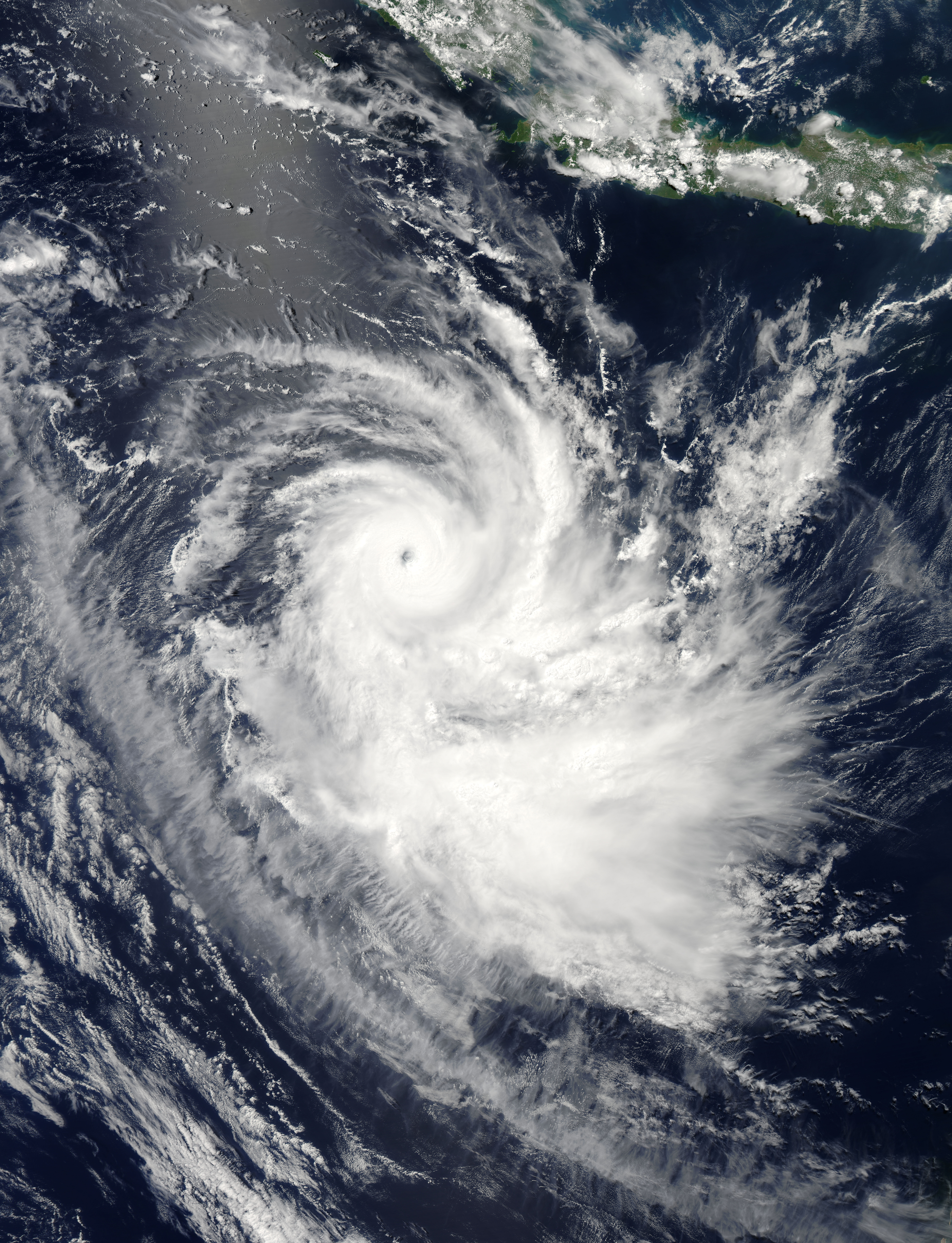
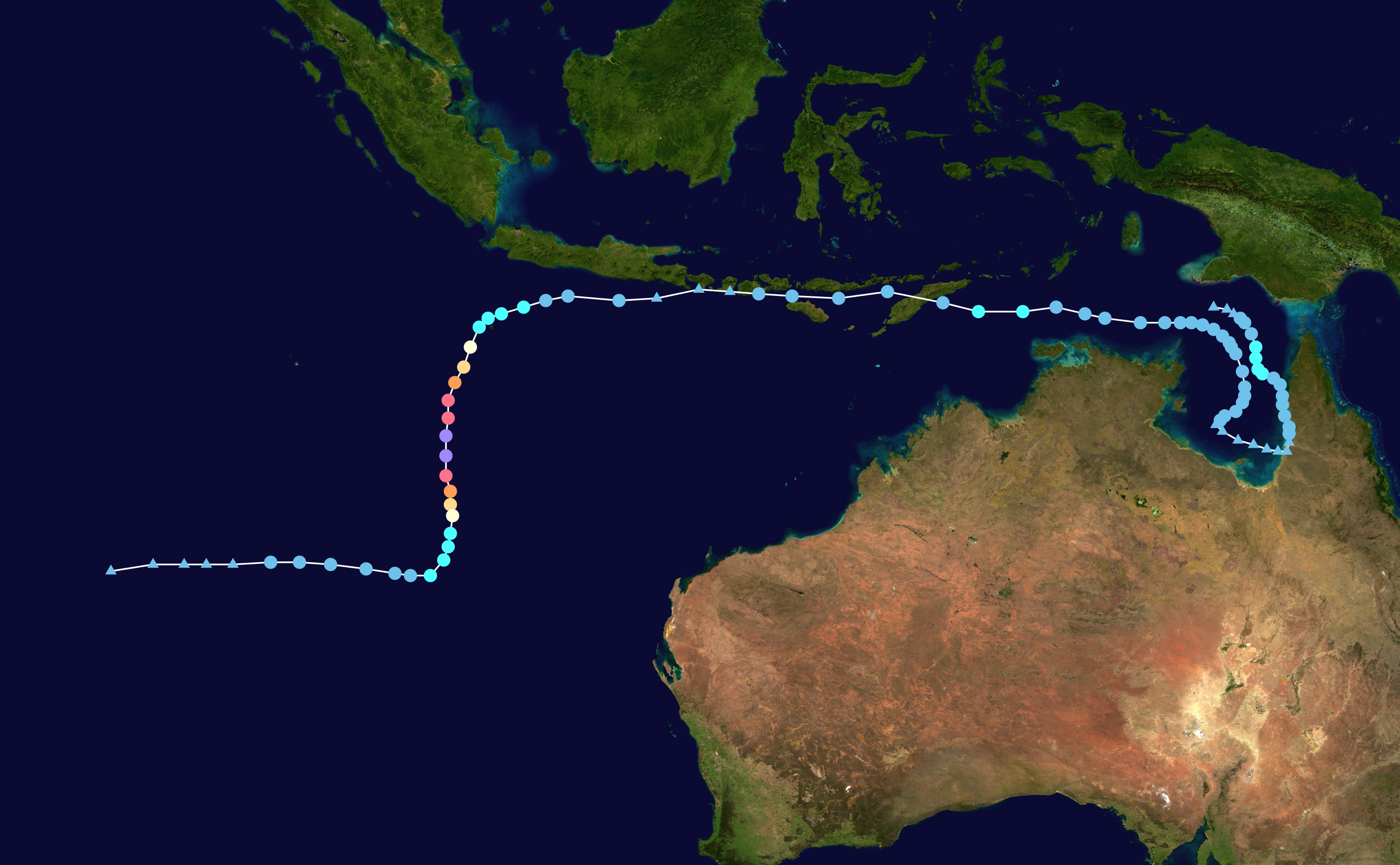
- Duration: 6 March – 27 March
- Peak intensity: 220 km/h (140 mph) (10-min); 927 hPa (mbar)

The BoM started to monitor a tropical low in the Gulf of Carpentaria on 6 March. Late on 8 March, the BoM upgraded it to an official tropical low. The next few days, the BoM upgraded it to Tropical Cyclone Gillian as it moved south. Because of two cyclones, Hadi and Lusi are close to each other, Gillian started to weaken to a tropical depression on 12 March as it began to move west. Early on 14 March, Gillian weakened to a tropical low as it moved north and weakened further because with less convection on 17 March. After the system affected the southern part of Indonesia, it began to move west on 19 March. Late on 20 March, Gillian began to organize again as it headed towards warmer waters. On 21 March, the BoM re-classified the system as a Category 1 tropical cyclone. From 23 to 24 March, Gillian entered a rapid deepening phase, and eventually intensified to a Category 5 severe tropical cyclone. The next day, Gillian weakened to a Category 3 cyclone and moved south. Late on 26 March, Gillian rapidly weakened and the JTWC issued their final warning on Gillian, as its remnants continued to move south, before turning westwards on 27 March. Very early on 27 March, the BoM issued its final warning on Gillian.

=== Severe Tropical Cyclone Ita ===
- Category 5 severe tropical cyclone (Australian scale)
- Category 5 tropical cyclone (SSHWS)
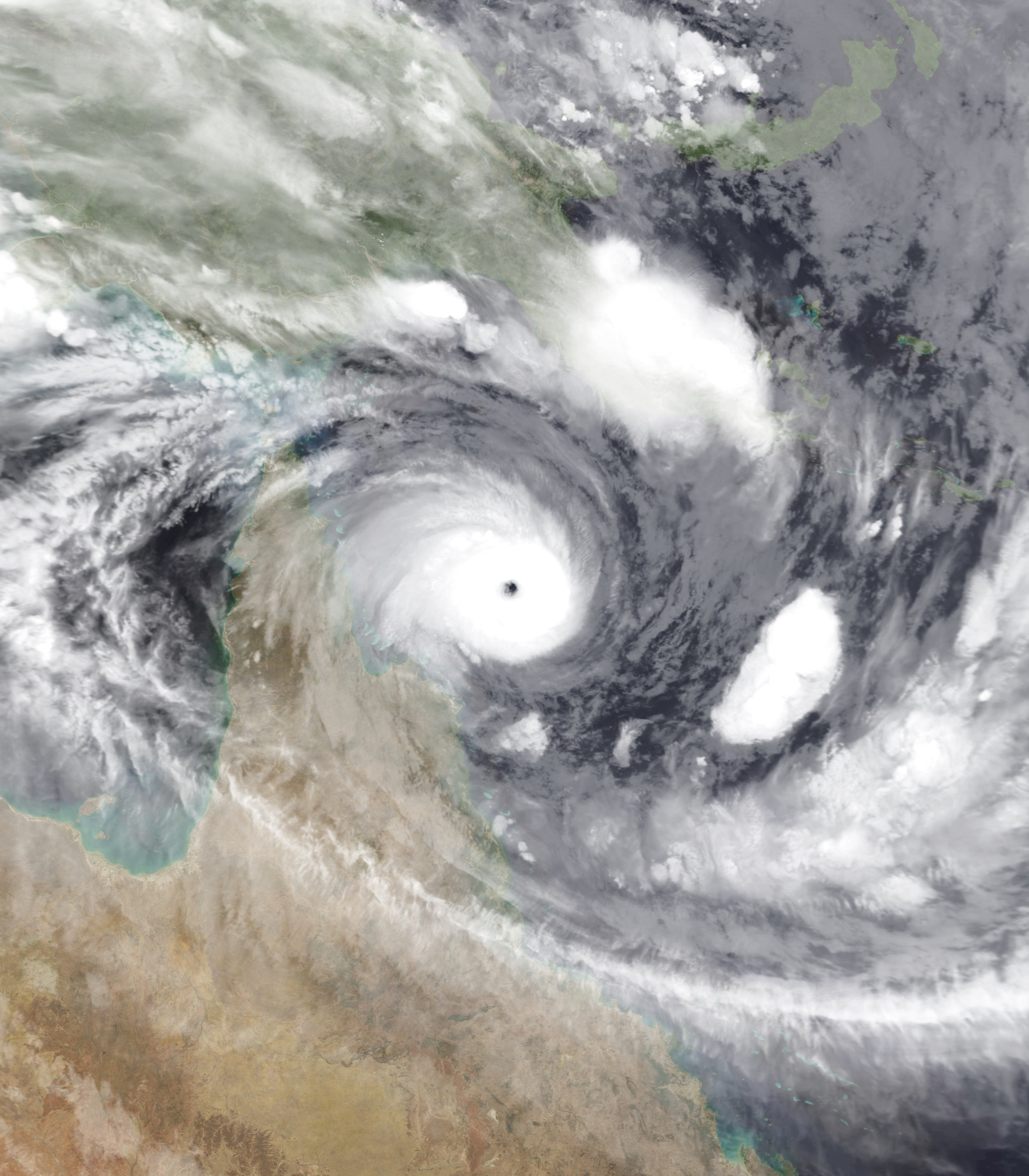
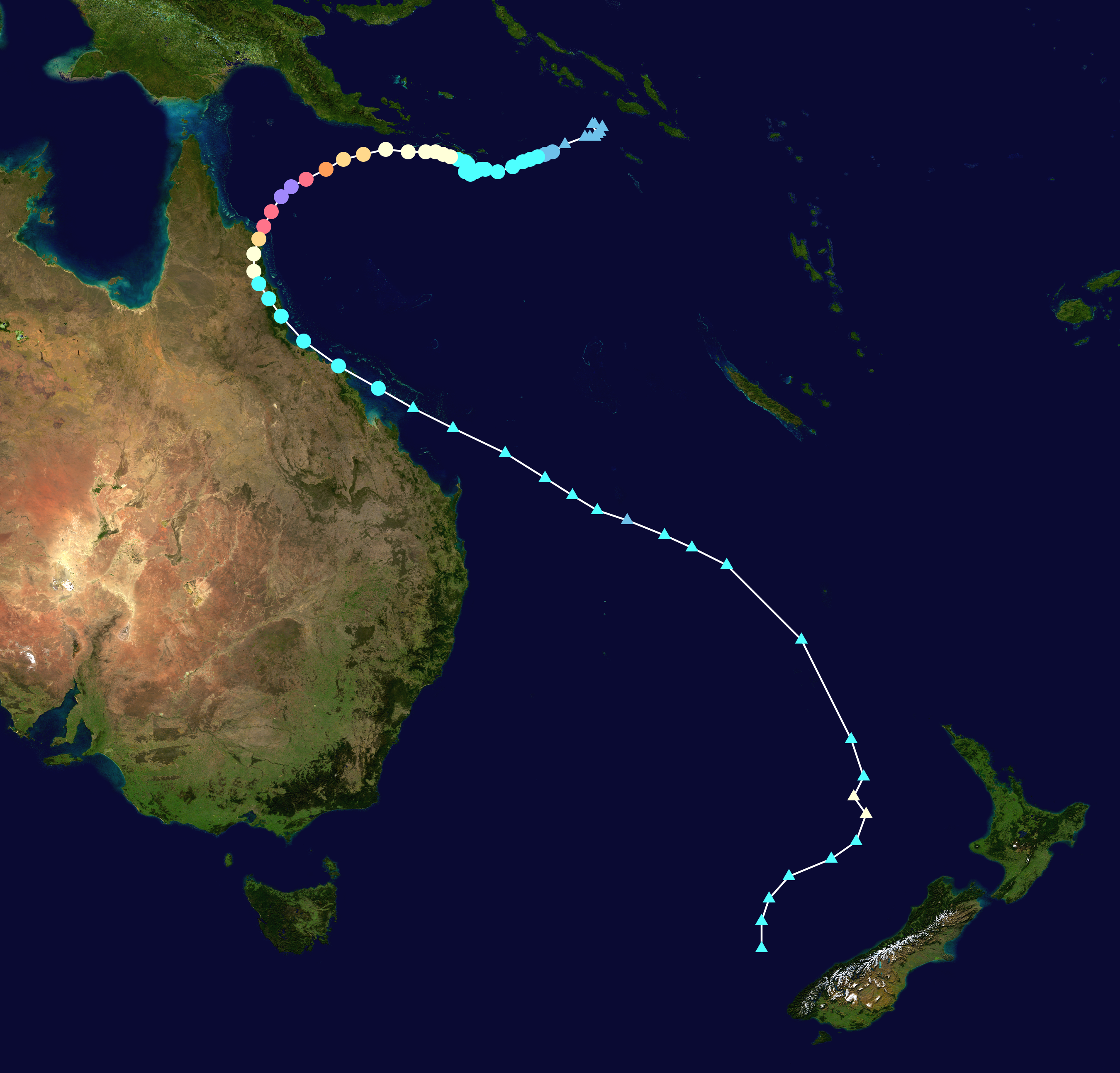
- Duration: 1 April – 14 April
- Peak intensity: 220 km/h (140 mph) (10-min); 922 hPa (mbar)

On 1 April, TCWC Brisbane reported that a tropical low had developed near the Solomon Islands. On 5 April, at least 16 people were killed by flash flooding from the tropical low in the Honiara area. By 7 April, the death toll from the storm rose to 21. During the next several days, Ita intensified into a Category 5 Severe Tropical Cyclone as it began to curve towards the coast of Queensland. On 11 April, the storm made landfall north of Cooktown as a Category 4 cyclone. Ita then rapidly weakened and was downgraded to a Category 1 on 12 April. Ita caused $1 billion AUD of damage, mostly to the agricultural industry. The cyclone also caused a rotavirus outbreak in the Solomon Islands. 40 people died from Ita due to the aforementioned rotavirus outbreak and flooding caused by the cyclone.

=== Severe Tropical Cyclone Jack ===
- Category 3 severe tropical cyclone (Australian scale)
- Category 2 tropical cyclone (SSHWS)
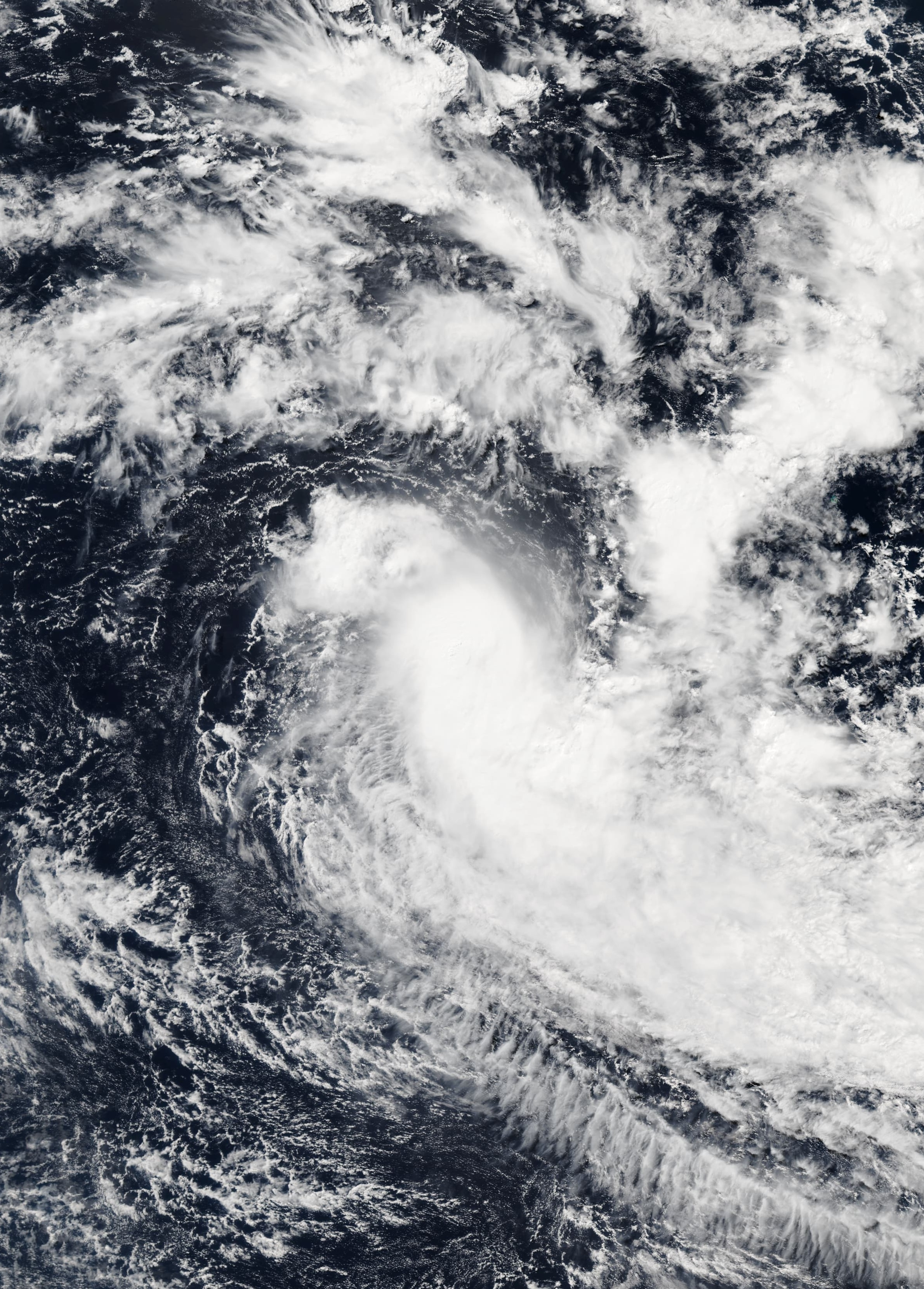
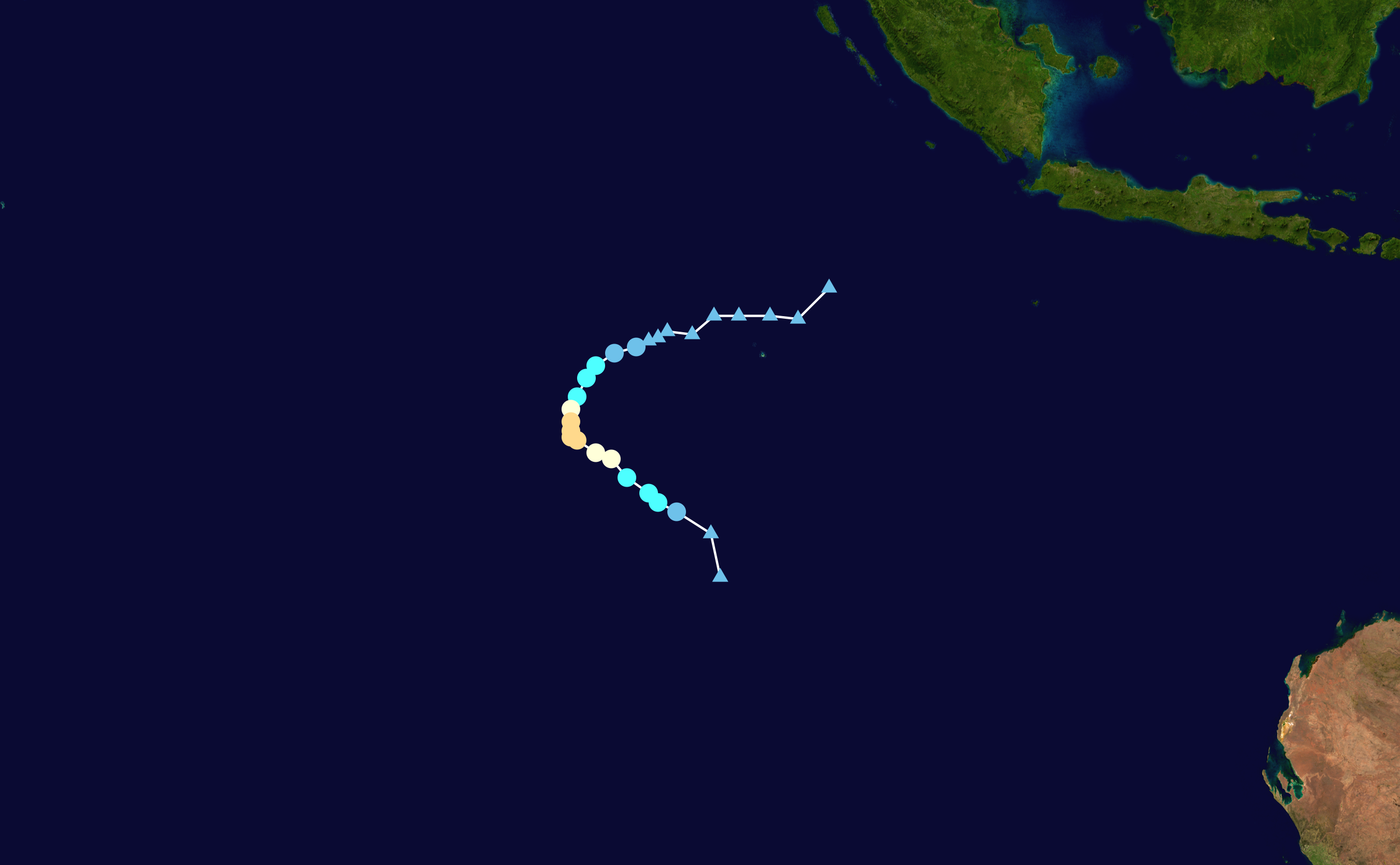
- Duration: 15 April – 22 April
- Peak intensity: 140 km/h (85 mph) (10-min); 966 hPa (mbar)

During 15 April, the BoM reported that Tropical Low 16U had developed, about 625 km (390 mi) to the northwest of Christmas Island. Over the next couple of days the system moved south-westwards and passed about 160 km (100 mi) to the northwest of the Cocos Islands, as it gradually developed further within a marginally favourable environment for further development. During 18 April the environment surrounding the system became conducive for rapid development with the system rapidly consolidating as a result. The JTWC subsequently initiated advisories on the low and designated it as Tropical Cyclone 24S, before the BoM reported during the next day that the system had become a category 1 tropical cyclone and named it Jack. The system continued to rapidly develop during 19 April and was classified as a category 3 severe tropical cyclone as it peaked with 10-minute sustained wind speeds of 140 km/h (85 mph).

=== Other systems ===
During December 2013, an active monsoon trough to the north of Western Australia produced several areas of low pressure and Tropical Low 04U in the lead up to Christmas. Tropical Low 04U developed within the monsoon trough on 22 December, within the Joseph Bonaparte Gulf to the northwest of Darwin, Australia. Over the next couple of days the system was the subject of tropical cyclone warnings as it moved westwards, before it was subsequently absorbed by a broader monsoon circulation, which eventually developed into Severe Tropical Cyclone Christine. On 7 February, TCWC Darwin started to monitor a tropical low that was located about 30 km (19 mi) to the southeast of Kununurra, Western Australia. Moving southwestwards inland, TCWC Darwin issued its final bulletin on 10 February. On 20 February, TCWC Darwin reported that a weak tropical low had formed in the southeastern Gulf of Carpentaria.

On 28 February, TCWC Brisbane reported that a weak tropical low had developed south of the Solomon Islands. The weak tropical low drifted in a westward direction until TCWC Brisbane made its final advisory on 2 March. On 21 April, TCWC Darwin reported that a weak tropical low had formed in the northern Arafura Sea. On 26 April, the system dissipated, and consequently, TCWC Darwin dropped the storm from their Tropical Weather Outlook.

== Storm names ==
During the season a total of 10 tropical cyclones received a name from BoM, either by TCWC Perth, Darwin, or Brisbane, when the system was judged to have 10-minute sustained windspeeds of 65 km/h (40 mph). There has only been one list that the Bureau of Meteorology have assigned names to tropical cyclones since the 2008–09 season. Tropical cyclones named by the TCWC Jakarta and Port Moresby are rare, with the last named cyclones occurring during 2010 and 2007, respectively.

- Alessia
- Bruce
- Christine
- Dylan
- Edna
- Fletcher
- Gillian
- Hadi
- Ita
- Jack

== Season effects ==
This is a table of all of the storms that have formed in the 2013–14 Australian region cyclone season. It includes their duration, names, landfall(s)–denoted by bold location names – damages, and death totals. Damage and deaths include totals while the storm was extratropical, a wave, or a low, and all of the damage figures are in 2014 AUD and USD.

Name	Dates	Peak intensity			Areas affected	Damage (USD)	Deaths	Ref(s).
Name	Dates	Category	Wind speed	Pressure	Areas affected	Damage (USD)	Deaths	Ref(s).
Alessia	20 November – 1 December	Category 1 tropical cyclone	75 km/h (45 mph)	993 hPa (29.32 inHg)	Western Australia, Northern Territory, Queensland	Minimal	None	
Bruce	16–19 December	Category 3 severe tropical cyclone	155 km/h (95 mph)	959 hPa (28.32 inHg)	Cocos Islands	None	None	
Christine	22 December – 1 January	Category 4 severe tropical cyclone	165 km/h (105 mph)	948 hPa (27.99 inHg)	Western Australia, South Australia, Victoria	Minor	None	
05U	10–23 January	Tropical low	55 km/h (35 mph)	990 hPa (29.23 inHg)	Northern Territory, Western Australia	None	None	
Dylan	24 – 31 January 2014	Category 2 tropical cyclone	110 km/h (70 mph)	974 hPa (28.76 inHg)	Queensland	Unknown	Unknown	
Fletcher	30 January – 12 February	Tropical low	65 km/h (40 mph)	992 hPa (29.29 inHg)	Northern Australia	None	None	
09U	31 January – 13 February 2014	Category 2 tropical cyclone	100 km/h (65 mph)	980 hPa (28.94 inHg)	Northern Territory, Western Australia	Unknown	Unknown	
Edna	31 January – 4 February	Category 1 tropical cyclone	75 km/h (45 mph)	992 hPa (29.29 inHg)	Queensland, Solomon Islands, New Caledonia	Unknown	None	
11U	7–10 February	Tropical low	Not specified	994 hPa (29.35 inHg)	Northern Territory	None	None	None
12U	28 February – 2 March	Tropical low	Not specified	Not specified	None	None	None	None
Hadi	28 February – 12 March 2014	Category 1 tropical cyclone	75 km/h (45 mph)	992 hPa (29.29 inHg)	Queensland, Papua New Guinea, Solomon Islands, Vanuatu	Unknown	None	
Gillian	6–27 March	Category 5 severe tropical cyclone	220 km/h (135 mph)	927 hPa (27.37 inHg)	Queensland, Northern Territory, East Timor, Indonesia, Christmas Island	Minor	Minor	None
Ita	1–14 April	Category 5 severe tropical cyclone	220 km/h (135 mph)	922 hPa (27.23 inHg)	Solomon Islands, Papua New Guinea, Queensland, New Zealand	$1.15 billion	22	
Jack	15–22 April	Category 3 severe tropical cyclone	140 km/h (85 mph)	966 hPa (28.53 inHg)	Cocos Islands	None	None	
17U	21–26 April	Tropical low	Not specified	1,006 hPa (29.71 inHg)	None	None	None	
Season aggregates
17 systems	20 November – 26 April		215 km/h (135 mph)	930 hPa (27.46 inHg)		$1.15 billion	22	

== See also ==
- Tropical cyclones in 2013 and 2014
- Australian region tropical cyclone
- List of Southern Hemisphere tropical cyclone seasons
- Atlantic hurricane seasons: 2013, 2014
- Pacific hurricane seasons: 2013, 2014
- Pacific typhoon seasons: 2013, 2014
- North Indian Ocean cyclone seasons: 2013, 2014
- 2013–14 South-West Indian Ocean cyclone season
- 2013–14 South Pacific cyclone season
