= Cyclone Gillian =

Category 5 Australian region tropical cyclone in 2014

Severe Tropical Cyclone Gillian
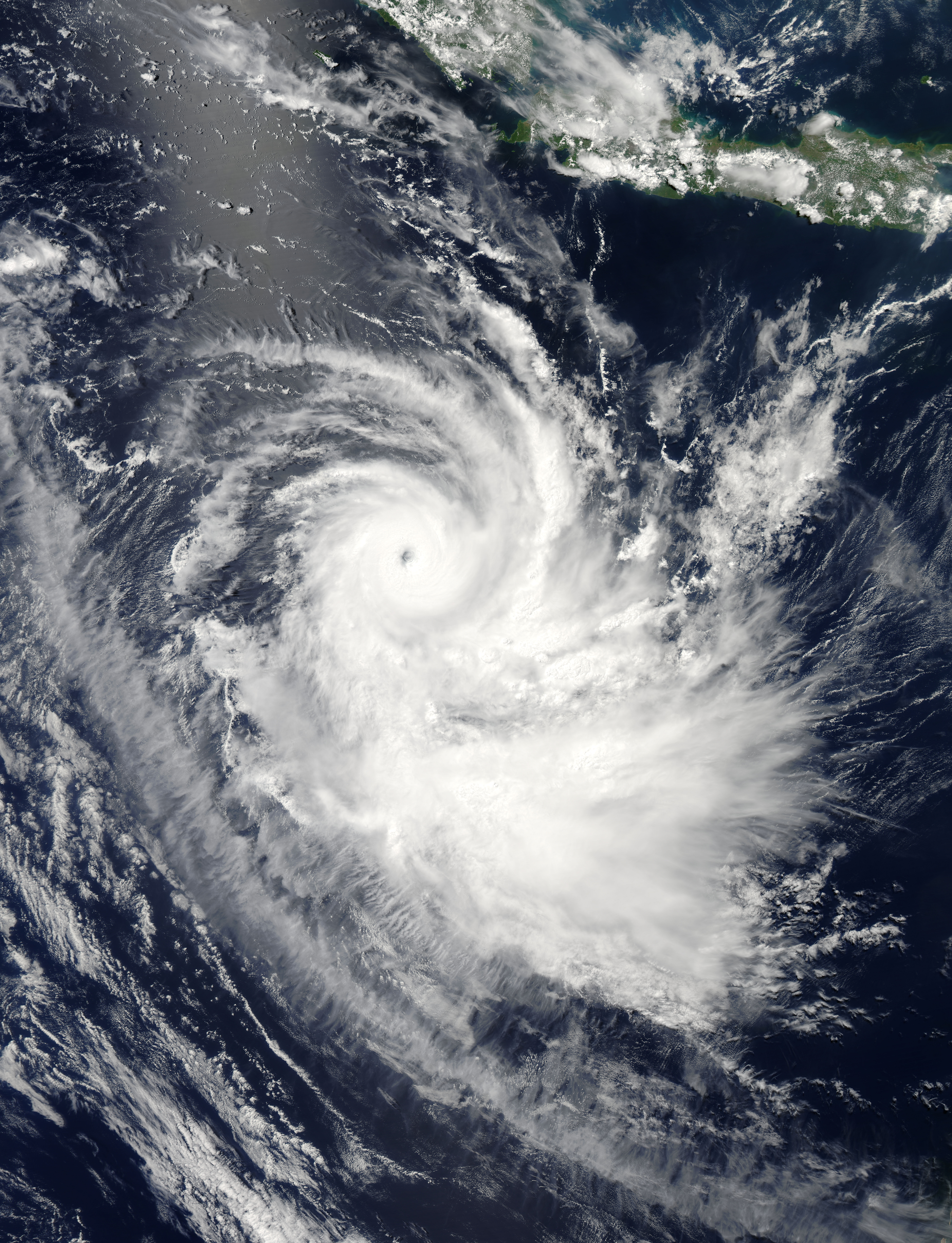
- Gillian near the end of its rapid intensification phase on 23 March

Meteorological history
- Formed: 6 March 2014
- Dissipated: 27 March 2014

Category 5 severe tropical cyclone
- 10-minute sustained (BOM)
- Highest winds: 220 km/h (140 mph)
- Highest gusts: 315 km/h (195 mph)
- Lowest pressure: 927 hPa (mbar); 27.37 inHg

Category 5-equivalent tropical cyclone
- 1-minute sustained (SSHWS/JTWC)
- Highest winds: 260 km/h (160 mph)
- Lowest pressure: 918 hPa (mbar); 27.11 inHg

Overall effects
- Fatalities: None reported
- Damage: Minimal
- Areas affected: Queensland, Northern Territory, East Timor, Indonesia, Christmas Island
- IBTrACS
- Part of the 2013–14 Australian region cyclone season

Severe Tropical Cyclone Gillian was the second most powerful of the 2013–14 Australian region cyclone season and the strongest in the basin in four years. It developed on 8 March, 2014, in the Gulf of Carpentaria offshore northern Australia. It drifted southeastward, moving over northwestern Queensland on 10 March as a weak tropical cyclone, and subsequently turned to the southwest and later to the west. Unfavourable wind shear, land interaction, and dry air prevented much restrengthening, and for several days Gillian was a weak tropical low. The storm moved northward and curved westward around the Top End of northwestern Australia, and subsequently moved across several islands in Indonesia, first Timor on 18 March. On 21 March, Gillian again became a tropical cyclone as it moved away from Indonesia. On the next day, it passed just southeast of Christmas Island as an intensifying storm, and subsequently Gillian underwent rapid deepening. On 23 March, the Bureau of Meteorology (BoM) estimated peak 10-minute sustained winds of 220 km/h (140 mph). On the same day, the Joint Typhoon Warning Center (JTWC) estimated peak 1-minute sustained winds of 260 km/h (160 mph), making it a Category 5 on the Saffir–Simpson hurricane wind scale. Increased wind shear caused the cyclone to rapidly weaken, and both BoM and JTWC discontinued advisories on Gillian on 26 March.

The cyclone affected northern Australia with gusty winds and some rainfall, while on the Indonesian island of Java, it produced strong waves. While moving near Christmas Island, Gillian downed thousands of trees and damaged the roof of one of the oldest buildings on the island. Winds gusted to 96 km/h (60 mph), making it the first cyclone to affect Christmas Island in six years. The storm also affected the search for missing Malaysia Airlines Flight 370.

== Meteorological history ==
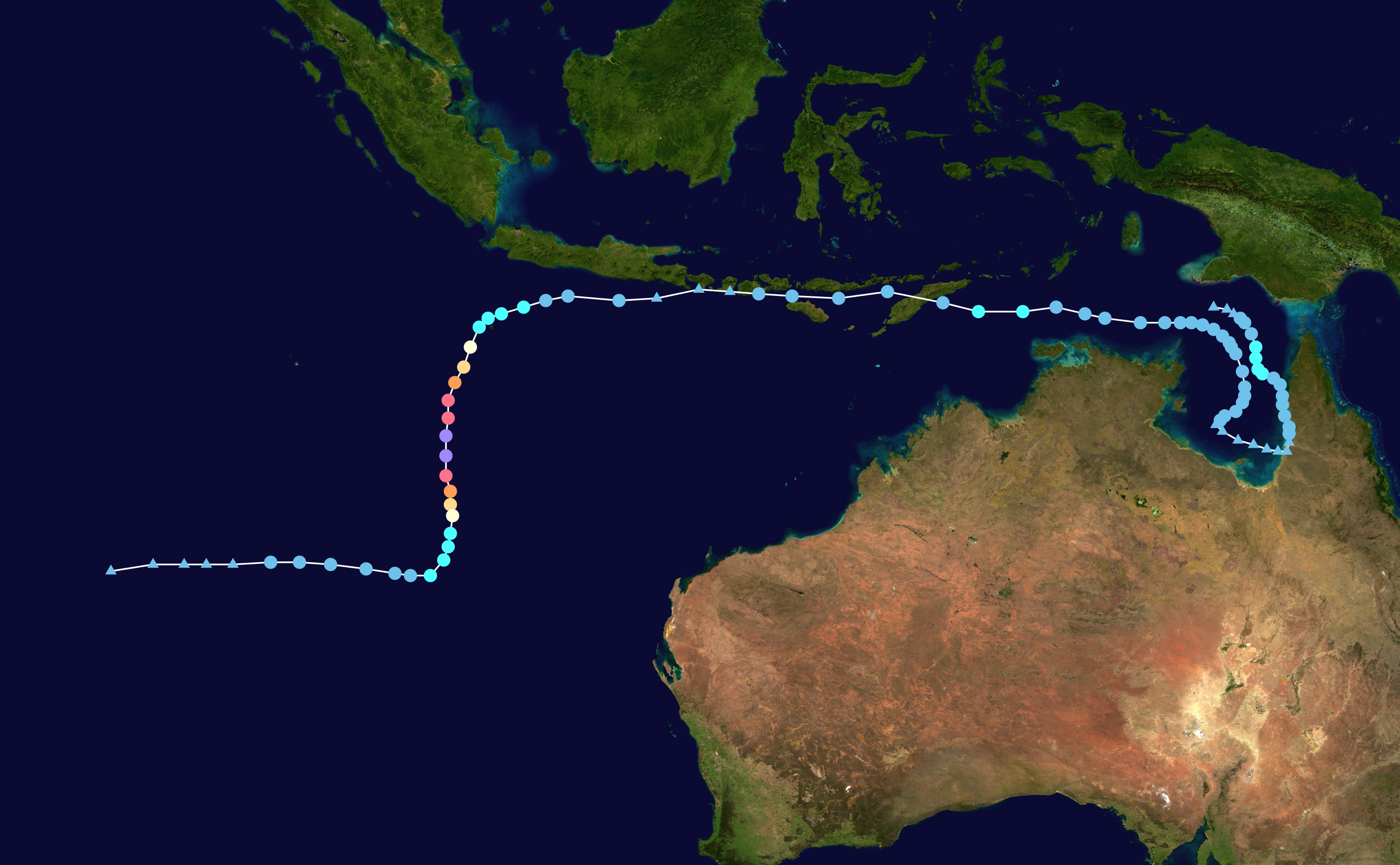
Map plotting the storm's track and intensity, according to the Saffir–Simpson scale Map key Saffir–Simpson scale Tropical depression (≤38 mph, ≤62 km/h) Tropical storm (39–73 mph, 63–118 km/h) Category 1 (74–95 mph, 119–153 km/h) Category 2 (96–110 mph, 154–177 km/h) Category 3 (111–129 mph, 178–208 km/h) Category 4 (130–156 mph, 209–251 km/h) Category 5 (≥157 mph, ≥252 km/h) Unknown Storm type Tropical cyclone Subtropical cyclone Extratropical cyclone, remnant low, tropical disturbance, or monsoon depression

The origins of Gillian were from a weak tropical low that persisted in the eastern Arafura Sea on 6 March. The next day, the system moved into the Gulf of Carpentaria, where it developed convection, or thunderstorms, which organised into curved rainbands. The thunderstorms were located west of a circulation, was exposed due to moderate wind shear. At 06:00 UTC on 8 March, the Bureau of Meteorology (BoM) office in Darwin began issuing warnings on the developing tropical low. Around that time, the United States Joint Typhoon Warning Center (JTWC), indicated the high potential for tropical cyclogenesis due to the increasingly organised circulation and convection. At 09:00 UTC on 8 March, the BoM upgraded the low to Tropical Cyclone Gillian, and six hours later, the JTWC initiated advisories on the storm as Tropical Cyclone 17P. After its formation, Gillian moved slowly southward toward Queensland within an area of weak steering currents. Despite ongoing wind shear, forecasters anticipated strengthening due to warm water temperatures and favourable outflow. The storm turned more toward the southeast due to the influence of a ridge to the northeast. Early on 10 March, Gillian made landfall along the western Cape York Peninsula of Queensland, after weakening below tropical cyclone status.

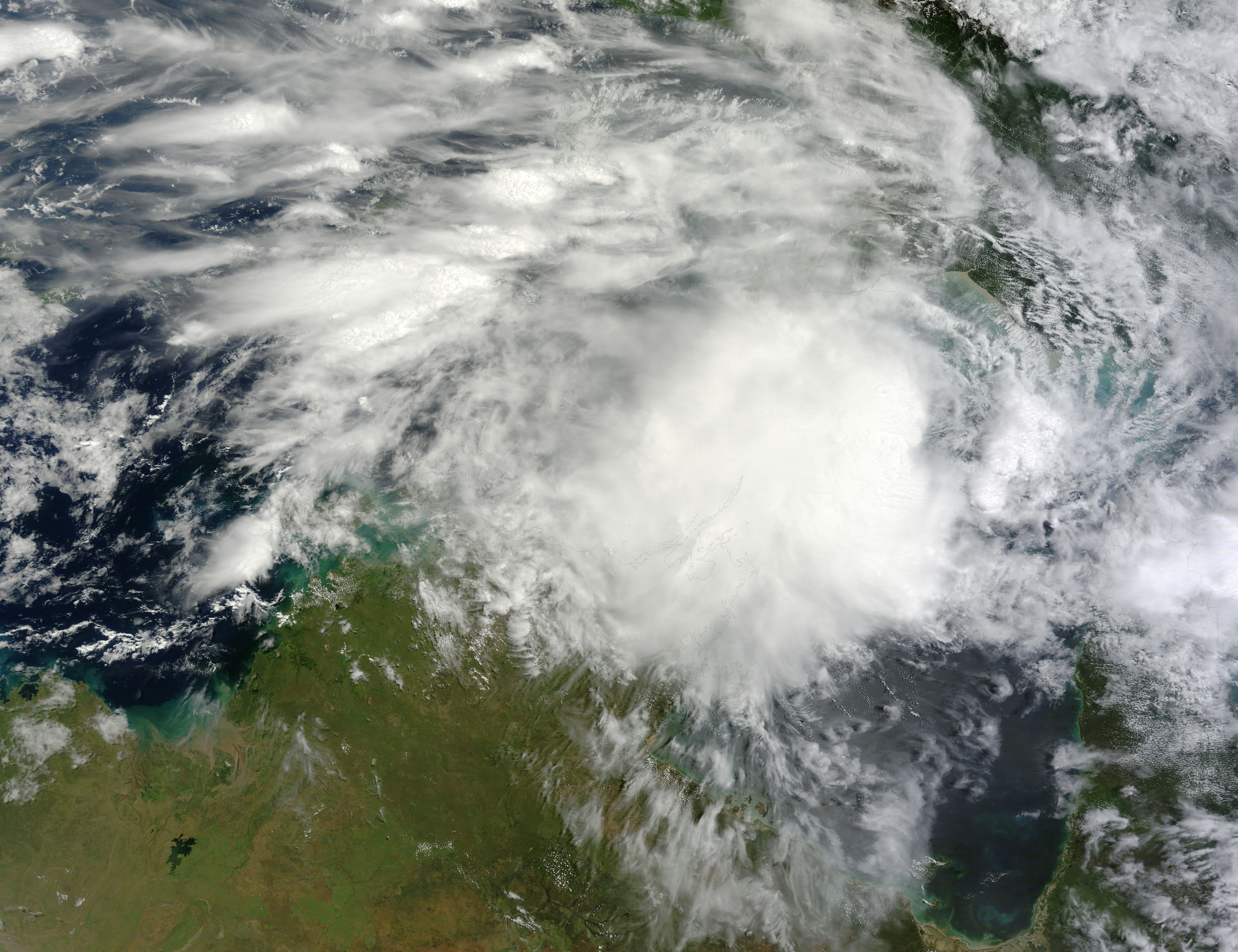
Cyclone Gillian approaching Cape York Peninsula on 8 March

A strengthening ridge to the south turned the storm to the southwest, bringing Gillian back over water; however, the circulation became poorly defined and the convection decreased due to land interaction. Early on 11 March the JTWC discontinued advisories. When Gillian was downgraded to a tropical low, the proximity to land and continued wind shear prevented initial redevelopment. The system tracked westward through the Gulf of Carpentaria due to the ridge to the south, passing just north of Mornington Island on 12 March. The next day, the convection reorganised as the circulation became better defined. On 14 March, the JTWC again assessed a high potential for Gillian redeveloping into a tropical cyclone, noting the appearance of a central dense overcast. At 06:00 UTC on the same day, the BoM again upgraded Gillian to tropical cyclone status in the central Gulf of Carpentaria. Due to a weak trough in the region, the storm turned to the northeast. Increasing wind shear again caused the storm to lose organisation early on 15 March, prompting the BoM to downgrade Gillian to a tropical low.

Dry air prevented the convection from initially reorganising after Gillian was downgraded. With a ridge to the south, the low turned westward around the Top End of northwestern Australia. On 17 March, the system moved north of 10° S, into the area of warning responsibility of the Indonesian Agency for Meteorology, Climatology and Geophysics. By that time, the low-level circulation was disconnected from its mid-level circulation, and land interaction with Indonesia was expected to prevent redevelopment. Late on 18 March, the storm moved over the island of Timor, and over the subsequent two days passed over several other Indonesian islands. On 21 March, the convection reorganised due to a drop in wind shear, and at 12:00 UTC that day, the BoM again upgraded Gillian to tropical cyclone status while the storm was about 380 km (240 mi) south-southeast of Jakarta. On the same day, the JTWC also re-initiated advisories on the storm, noting that the circulation had improved as it moved away from Indonesia. With low wind shear and favourable outflow, Gillian gradually intensified while moving southwestward around the ridge. On 22 March, the storm passed just north of Christmas Island while Gillian was developing an eye; by that time, the 10 minute sustained winds had increased to 95 km/h (59 mph) within an environment favourable for continued strengthening.

At 12:00 UTC on 22 March, the BoM upgraded the storm to a Category 3 on the Australian tropical cyclone intensity scale with 10 minute winds of 120 km/h (75 mph), the equivalent of a minimal hurricane; a few hours later, the JTWC followed suit. The cyclone continued to rapidly intensify, with a well-defined anticyclone providing good outflow and very low wind shear. At 12:00 UTC on 23 March, the BoM estimated Gillian attained peak 10 minute winds of 205 km/h (127 mph), making it a Category 5 on the Australian scale, while located about 1,000 km (620 mi) south-southwest of Jakarta; the agency also estimated peak gusts of 285 km/h (177 mph). At 18:00 UTC on 23 March, the JTWC estimated peak 1 minute winds of 260 km/h (160 mph). By that time, the eye had contracted to a diameter of 22 km (14 mi), but was beginning to undergo an eyewall replacement cycle. In addition, Gillian was experiencing increased wind shear due to an approaching trough, indicative of weakening. It continued around the ridge and turned more to the south over open waters well to the west of Western Australia. The eye became less distinct, and early on 25 March Gillian weakened below Category 3 intensity on the Australian scale. On the same day, the JTWC also downgraded the cyclone to tropical storm strength, noting the storm's rapid weakening corresponded to a decline in Dvorak numbers – a system to estimate intensity via satellites. The circulation became exposed from the convection, and BoM downgraded Gillian to a tropical low on 26 March, the same day that the JTWC discontinued advisories after the circulation began dissipating.

== Preparations and impact ==
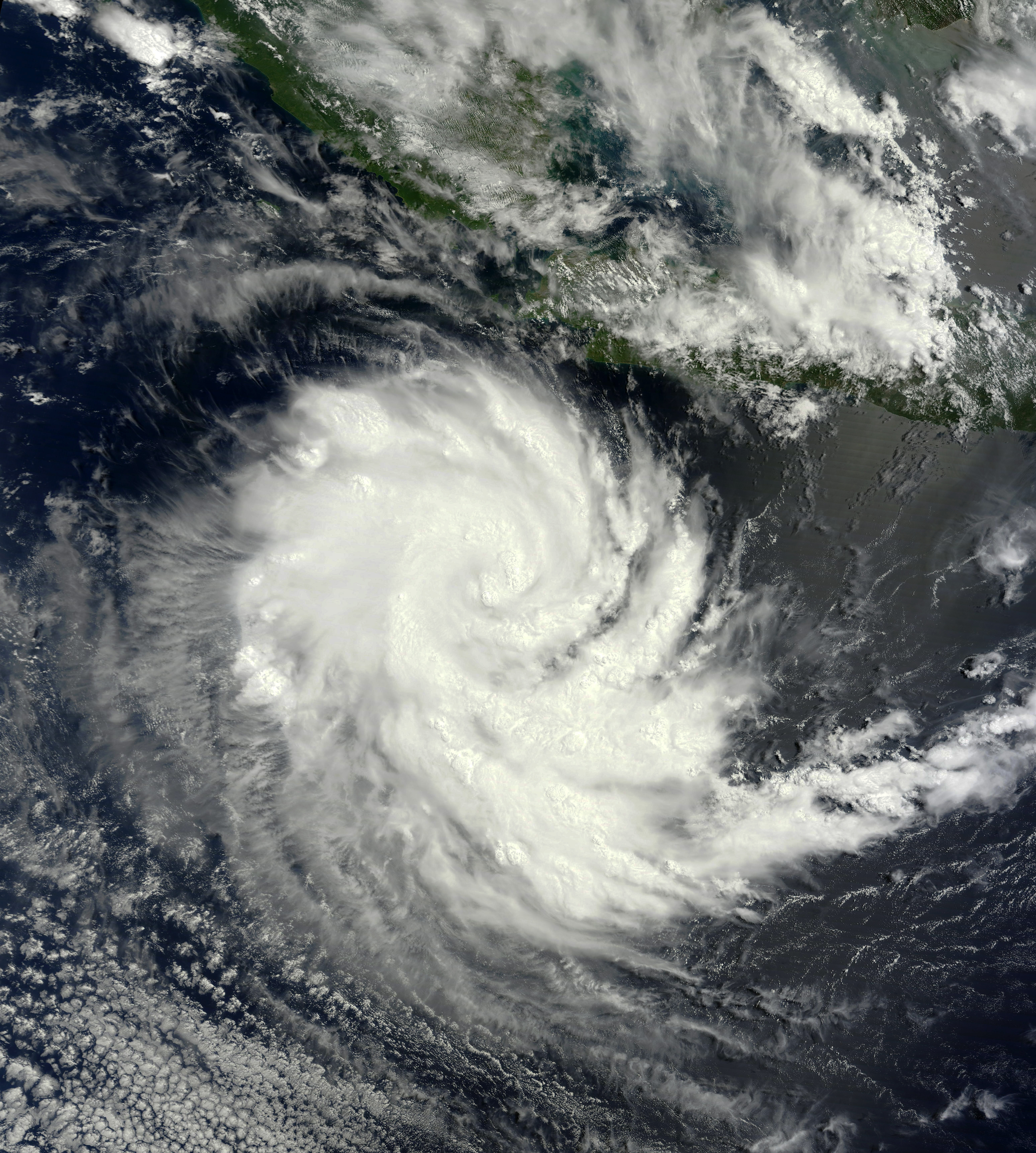
Cyclone Gillian near Christmas Island on 22 March

Much of Far North Queensland was affected by rain for over a week as Gillian slowly moved through the Gulf of Carpentaria. The heaviest rains, averaging 150 to 250 mm (5.9 to 9.8 in), fell along a corridor along southern part of the Cape York Peninsula from the Mitchell-Alice Rivers National Park to Cooktown. 227.4 mm (8.95 in) of rain from 9–15 March with gusts up to 57 km/h (35 mph) in Kowanyama, Queensland. On 17 March, Gillian brushed the Top End region, bringing only minor rainfall to coastal areas. Winds reached 45 km/h (28 mph) in the Wessel Islands.

Across Java, Indonesia, the storm produced moderate to heavy rains. After re-intensifying into a tropical cyclone, swells of 3 to 5 m (9.8 to 16.4 ft) from the storm affected southern shores of the island. Though well to the north of Cyclone Gillian, the system's circulation drew moisture away from Riau western Indonesia, leaving behind fire-prone conditions. Due in part to illegal logging and slash-and-burn land clearing, several new forest fires began by 23 March.

On 20 March, the BoM issued a cyclone watch for Christmas Island, and the next day upgraded it to a cyclone warning. The first cyclone to affect Christmas Island since Cyclone Rosie in 2008, Gillian approached the island as a category 2 system, causing light to moderate damage. Only one structure on the island, the Immigration Detention Centre, is constructed to cyclone-standards on the island. Island administrator Jon Stanhope stated that the 1,700 asylum seekers were likely safer than residents in permanent homes. Gale-force winds, peaking at 96 km/h (60 mph), battered the island for 15 hours. Several homes lost their roof and one family had to be evacuated; however, most structures were left unscathed. The roof of the Rumah Tinggi Bar and Restaurant, one of the oldest buildings on the island, was torn off. Thousands of trees were reportedly downed across the island, with jungles sustaining significant losses, and there were power outages due to significant damage to the islands powerlines. Gillian also dropped 181 mm (7.1 in) of rainfall over a 24‑hour period on the island.

On 23 March, several aircraft at Subang airport in Malaysia taking part in the 26-nation search for Malaysia Airlines Flight 370 were grounded due to inclement weather. It was noted that Gillian could hamper rescue efforts in the southern corridor search for the aircraft.

== See also ==
- Cyclone Inigo - struck Indonesia in 2003 in its formative stages
- Cyclone Hellen - another cyclone which intensified rapidly in the Indian Ocean just one week after Gillian.
