= List of retired Australian region cyclone names =

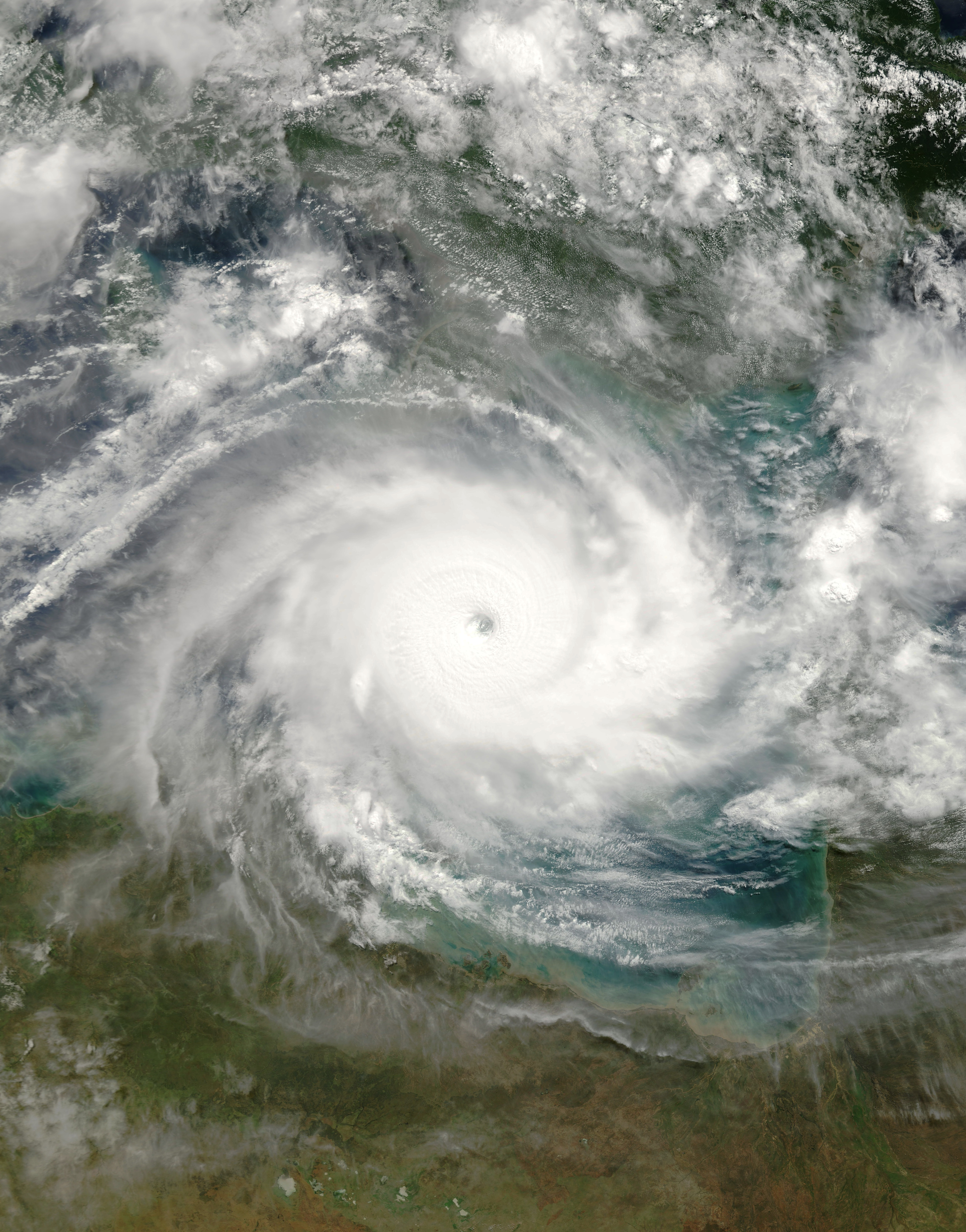
Satellite image of Cyclone Monica, the strongest recorded tropical cyclone in the Australian region by wind speed

Tropical cyclones are non-frontal, low-pressure systems that develop, within an environment of warm sea surface temperatures and little vertical wind shear aloft. Within the Australian region, names are assigned from three pre-determined lists, to such systems, once they reach or exceed ten–minute sustained wind speeds of 65 km/h (40 mph), near the center, by either the Australian Bureau of Meteorology, Papua New Guinea's National Weather Service or Indonesia's Badan Meteorologi Klimatologi dan Geofisika. Within the Australian region, tropical cyclones have been officially named since the 1963–64 Australian region cyclone season, though several meteorological papers show that a few tropical cyclones were named before 1964–65. The names of significant tropical cyclones that cause a high amount of damage and/or loss of life are retired from the lists of tropical cyclone names by the World Meteorological Organization's RA V Tropical Cyclone Committee at their bi-annual meeting. Storms named by Port Moresby are automatically retired regardless of their impact due to their infrequent occurrence.

Within the Australian region, there have been a total of 136 tropical cyclone names retired. Among the retired storms are cyclones Gwenda and Inigo, two of the most intense systems ever recorded in the Southern Hemisphere; both attained a barometric pressure of 900 hPa (26.58 inHg). The deadliest cyclone to have its name retired was Cyclone Freddy in 2023, which killed 1,434 people across the Indian Ocean, while the most damaging system to have its name retired was Cyclone Gabrielle in 2023, which left A$12.6 billion (US$8.4 billion 2023 USD) in losses; however, their effects occurred outside the Australian region, with Freddy impacting Madagascar, Malawi and Mozambique in the South-West Indian Ocean, and Gabrielle affecting New Zealand in the South Pacific Ocean as an extratropical system. Therefore, the deadliest cyclone to have its name retired and whose effects were solely concentrated in the Australian region was Cyclone Seroja in 2021, which killed 272 people in East Timor and Indonesia, and the costliest cyclone to have its name retired for its impacts within the basin was Cyclone Debbie in 2017, which caused A$3.5 billion (US$2.67 billion) worth of damages.

== Background ==
Within the region the credit for the first usage of personal names for weather systems, is generally given to the Queensland Government Meteorologist Clement Wragge, who named systems between 1887 and 1907. Wragge used names drawn from the letters of the Greek alphabet, Greek and Roman mythology and female names, to describe weather systems including tropical cyclones over Australia, New Zealand and the Antarctic. After the new Australian government had failed to create a federal weather bureau and appoint him director, Wragge started naming cyclones after political figures.

During the latter stages of World War II, forecasters with the United States Armed Forces started naming tropical cyclones over the Pacific Ocean after their wives and sweethearts. In 1945, after the practice had become popular among forecasters who found that it reduced confusion during map discussions, the Armed Forces formalized the scheme and began publicly assigning female names to tropical cyclones in the Northern Hemisphere and male names to those in the Southern Hemisphere. Over the next few years, the practice gradually fell into disuse in the Southern Hemisphere, before it was revived by the Meteorological Service of New Caledonia during the 1958–59 season. In November 1962, New Caledonia proposed to the Third Session of the World Meteorological Organization's Regional Association V that all tropical cyclones that occurred within the region should be identified with female names. In response, other members of the Association suggested using male names to avoid any confusion with the names used in the Northern Hemisphere, but noted that any naming scheme would require close coordination in order to prevent causing confusion. Ultimately, the Association decided that there was no need for a regional naming scheme to be introduced to the south of the Equator; however, it had no objections to members using such schemes on a national basis provided that the same names were not allocated in neighboring regions to different cyclones.

In October 1963, the Australian Bureau of Meteorology announced that its three tropical cyclone warning centres in Perth, Darwin and Brisbane would begin naming tropical cyclones during the upcoming season.

During the International Women's Year of 1975 the Australian Science Minister ordered that tropical cyclones, within the Australian region, should carry both men's and women's names. This was because the minister thought "that both sexes should bear the odium of the devastation caused by cyclones." As a result, male names were added to the lists of names for both basins, ahead of the 1975–76 season.

== Tropical cyclone names retired ==
=== 1960s ===
Name	Dates	Peak intensity			Areas affected	Damage (USD)	Deaths	Ref(s).
Name	Dates	Category	Wind speed	Pressure	Areas affected	Damage (USD)	Deaths	Ref(s).
Audrey	7–14 January 1964	Category 2 tropical cyclone	Not specified	983 hPa (29.03 inHg)	Northern Territory, Queensland	Extensive	None	
Flora	1–5 December 1964	Category 3 severe tropical cyclone	140 km/h (85 mph)	965 hPa (28.50 inHg)	Northern Territory, Queensland	Extensive	None	
Dinah	22–31 January 1967	Category 4 severe tropical cyclone	165 km/h (105 mph)	945 hPa (27.91 inHg)	Queensland	Severe	None	
3 names	7 January 1964 – 31 January 1967		165 km/h (105 mph)	945 hPa (27.91 inHg)		Severe	None	(Note: Reference for the names retired between 1963 and 2020.)

=== 1970s ===
Name	Dates	Peak intensity			Areas affected	Damage (USD)	Deaths	Ref(s).
Name	Dates	Category	Wind speed	Pressure	Areas affected	Damage (USD)	Deaths	Ref(s).
Ada	1–19 January 1970	Category 3 severe tropical cyclone	130 km/h (80 mph)	962 hPa (28.41 inHg)	Queensland	$8.9 million	13	
Dora	10–17 February 1971	Category 1 tropical cyclone	75 km/h (45 mph)	990 hPa (29.23 inHg)	Queensland	Widespread	None	
Gertie; Fiona	10–28 February 1971	Category 3 severe tropical cyclone	150 km/h (90 mph)	960 hPa (28.35 inHg)	Northern Territory, Queensland		None	
Althea	10–27 December 1971	Category 3 severe tropical cyclone	130 km/h (80 mph)	965 hPa (28.50 inHg)	Queensland	$18.5 million	3	
Daisy	5–16 February 1972	Category 3 severe tropical cyclone	130 km/h (80 mph)	959 hPa (28.32 inHg)	Queensland	$1.48 million	None	
Emily	27 March – 2 April 1972	Category 3 severe tropical cyclone	155 km/h (100 mph)	945 hPa (27.91 inHg)	Queensland		8	
Madge	8–18 March 1973	Category 4 severe tropical cyclone	165 km/h (105 mph)	952 hPa (28.11 inHg)	Northern Territory, Queensland		None	
Wanda	20–25 January 1974	Category 2 tropical cyclone	95 km/h (60 mph)	998 hPa (29.47 inHg)	Queensland, New South Wales	$50.4 million	16	
Tracy	21–26 December 1974	Category 4 severe tropical cyclone	175 km/h (110 mph)	950 hPa (28.05 inHg)	Northern Territory	$1.48 billion	71	
Trixie	15–22 February 1975	Category 5 severe tropical cyclone	215 km/h (130 mph)	925 hPa (27.32 inHg)	Western Australia	$3.71 million	None	
Joan	30 November – 10 December 1975	Category 5 severe tropical cyclone	215 km/h (130 mph)	915 hPa (27.02 inHg)	Western Australia	$18.6 million	None	
Beth	13–22 February 1976	Category 3 severe tropical cyclone	130 km/h (80 mph)	965 hPa (28.50 inHg)	Queensland	$3.13 million	None	(Note: This damage total was originally reported in Australian Dollars and was converted to United States Dollars via the fxtop website.)
Ted	15–21 December 1976	Category 4 severe tropical cyclone	185 km/h (115 mph)	950 hPa (28.05 inHg)	Queensland		None	
Alby	27 March – 5 April 1978	Category 5 severe tropical cyclone	205 km/h (125 mph)	930 hPa (27.46 inHg)	Western Australia	37.1 million	None	
14 names	1 January 1970 – 5 April 1978		215 km/h (130 mph)	915 hPa (27.02 inHg)		$1.62 billion	111	

=== 1980s ===
Name	Dates	Peak intensity			Areas affected	Damage (USD)	Deaths	Ref(s).
Name	Dates	Category	Wind speed	Pressure	Areas affected	Damage (USD)	Deaths	Ref(s).
Simon	21–28 February 1980	Category 4 severe tropical cyclone	165 km/h (105 mph)	950 hPa (28.05 inHg)	Queensland, New Zealand	Minor	None	
Cliff	8–15 February 1981	Category 3 severe tropical cyclone	120 km/h (75 mph)	970 hPa (28.64 inHg)	New Caledonia, Queensland, Vanuatu	Unknown	None	
Daphne	11–21 January 1982	Category 2 tropical cyclone	95 km/h (60 mph)	986 hPa (29.12 inHg)	Western Australia	Minor	None	
Dominic	4–13 April 1982	Category 5 severe tropical cyclone	215 km/h (130 mph)	950 hPa (28.05 inHg)	Queensland	3.6 million	None	
Elinor	10 February – 3 March 1983	Category 4 severe tropical cyclone	165 km/h (105 mph)	935 hPa (27.61 inHg)	Queensland	Minor	None	
Jane	2–11 January 1983	Category 4 severe tropical cyclone	165 km/h (105 mph)	947 hPa (27.96 inHg)	Western Australia	None	None	
Kathy	16–24 March 1984	Category 5 severe tropical cyclone	220 km/h (140 mph)	920 hPa (27.17 inHg)	Cape York Peninsula, Northern Territory	$12 million	1	
Lance	4–7 April 1984	Category 2 tropical cyclone	110 km/h (70 mph)	980 hPa (28.94 inHg)	Queensland		None	
Nigel	14–20 January 1985	Category 3 severe tropical cyclone	150 km/h (90 mph)	955 hPa (28.20 inHg)	Vanuatu, Fiji		None	
Sandy	20–24 March 1985	Category 4 severe tropical cyclone	195 km/h (120 mph)	953 hPa (28.14 inHg)	Northern Territory, Western Australia		None	
Margot	10–25 April 1985	Category 3 severe tropical cyclone	155 km/h (100 mph)	942 hPa (27.82 inHg)	Western Australia		None	
Winifred	27 January – 5 February 1986	Category 3 severe tropical cyclone	155 km/h (100 mph)	957 hPa (28.26 inHg)	Queensland	$130 million	2	
Manu	21–27 April 1986	Category 3 severe tropical cyclone	130 km/h (80 mph)	970 hPa (28.64 inHg)	Papua New Guinea, Queensland	Extensive	None	
Connie	15–23 January 1987	Category 3 severe tropical cyclone	155 km/h (100 mph)	950 hPa (28.05 inHg)	Western Australia		None	
Jason	5–14 February 1987	Category 2 tropical cyclone	110 km/h (70 mph)	975 hPa (28.79 inHg)	Northern Territory		None	
Elsie	22–27 February 1987	Category 4 severe tropical cyclone	185 km/h (115 mph)	940 hPa (27.76 inHg)	Western Australia		None	
Agi	8–16 January 1988	Category 2 tropical cyclone	110 km/h (70 mph)	980 hPa (28.94 inHg)	Papua New Guinea, New Caledonia		None	
Charlie	21 February – 1 March 1988	Category 2 tropical cyclone	95 km/h (60 mph)	985 hPa (29.09 inHg)	Queensland	$200,000	1	
Herbie	17–21 May 1988	Category 1 tropical cyclone	75 km/h (45 mph)	980 hPa (28.94 inHg)	Western Australia	$20 million	None	
Ilona	12–19 December 1988	Category 3 severe tropical cyclone	150 km/h (90 mph)	960 hPa (28.35 inHg)	Western Australia	$741,800	None	
Delilah	28 December 1988 – 4 January 1989	Category 2 tropical cyclone	100 km/h (65 mph)	988 hPa (29.18 inHg)	New Caledonia, New Zealand		2	
Ned	25 March – 1 April 1989	Category 4 severe tropical cyclone	185 km/h (115 mph)	941 hPa (27.79 inHg)	Western Australia	Minor	None	
Aivu	31 March – 5 April 1989	Category 5 severe tropical cyclone	205 km/h (125 mph)	935 hPa (27.61 inHg)	Queensland	$90 million	1	
Orson	17–24 April 1989	Category 5 severe tropical cyclone	240 km/h (150 mph)	905 hPa (26.72 inHg)	Western Australia	$16 million	5	
Pedro	6–13 November 1989	Category 2 tropical cyclone	110 km/h (70 mph)	982 hPa (29.00 inHg)	Cocos Island	Minor	None	
Felicity	13–20 December 1989	Category 3 severe tropical cyclone	140 km/h (85 mph)	970 hPa (28.64 inHg)	Cape York Peninsula	Minor	None	

=== 1990s ===
Name	Dates	Peak intensity			Areas affected	Damage (USD)	Deaths	Ref(s).
Name	Dates	Category	Wind speed	Pressure	Areas affected	Damage (USD)	Deaths	Ref(s).
Tina	25–28 January 1990	Category 2 tropical cyclone	95 km/h (60 mph)	976 hPa (28.82 inHg)	Western Australia	Minor	None	
Ivor	15–26 March 1990	Category 4 severe tropical cyclone	165 km/h (105 mph)	965 hPa (28.50 inHg)	Cape York Peninsula	$15 million	None	
Joy	15–27 December 1990	Category 4 severe tropical cyclone	165 km/h (105 mph)	940 hPa (27.76 inHg)	Solomon Islands, Queensland	$135 million	6	
Fifi	15–20 April 1991	Category 2 tropical cyclone	110 km/h (70 mph)	975 hPa (28.79 inHg)	Western Australia	$1.03 million	29	
Mark	6–10 January 1992	Category 2 tropical cyclone	100 km/h (65 mph)	980 hPa (28.94 inHg)	Queensland, Northern Territory	$3.5 million	None	
Ian	27 February – 3 March 1992	Category 4 severe tropical cyclone	195 km/h (120 mph)	930 hPa (27.46 inHg)	Western Australia		None	
Nina	21 December 1992 – 5 January 1993	Category 4 severe tropical cyclone	165 km/h (105 mph)	960 hPa (28.35 inHg)	Queensland, Tonga, Papua New Guinea; Solomon Islands, Wallis and Futuna	$1 million	3	
Lena	22 January – 2 February 1993	Category 2 tropical cyclone	100 km/h (65 mph)	980 hPa (28.94 inHg)	None	None	None	
Oliver	5–14 February 1993	Category 4 severe tropical cyclone	185 km/h (115 mph)	950 hPa (28.05 inHg)	Queensland		None	
Roger	12–21 March 1993	Category 2 tropical cyclone	110 km/h (70 mph)	980 hPa (28.94 inHg)	Solomon Islands, New Caledonia		None	
Adel	13–15 May 1993	Category 3 severe tropical cyclone	120 km/h (75 mph)	970 hPa (28.64 inHg)	Papua New Guinea		3	
Naomi	15–18 December 1993	Category 3 severe tropical cyclone	150 km/h (90 mph)	960 hPa (28.35 inHg)	Western Australia		None	
Pearl	11–21 January 1994	Category 3 severe tropical cyclone	155 km/h (100 mph)	960 hPa (28.35 inHg)	None	None	None	
Quenton	22–29 January 1994	Category 3 severe tropical cyclone	150 km/h (90 mph)	955 hPa (28.20 inHg)	None	None	None	
Theodore	22–28 February 1994	Category 5 severe tropical cyclone	215 km/h (130 mph)	910 hPa (26.87 inHg)	Papua New Guinea, Solomon Islands, New Caledonia	Unknown	1	
Sharon	12–22 March 1994	Category 4 severe tropical cyclone	195 km/h (120 mph)	930 hPa (27.46 inHg)	Indonesia, Western Australia	None	None	
Annette	12–20 December 1994	Category 4 severe tropical cyclone	195 km/h (120 mph)	925 hPa (27.32 inHg)	Western Australia, South Australia		None	
Bobby	19–27 February 1995	Category 4 severe tropical cyclone	195 km/h (120 mph)	925 hPa (27.32 inHg)	Northern Territory, Western Australia		8	
Violet	3–6 March 1995	Category 3 severe tropical cyclone	155 km/h (100 mph)	960 hPa (28.35 inHg)	Lord Howe Island, New South Wales	Minor	None	
Warren	4–6 March 1995	Category 3 severe tropical cyclone	150 km/h (90 mph)	960 hPa (28.35 inHg)	Queensland, Northern Territory		None	
Chloe	3–9 April 1995	Category 5 severe tropical cyclone	220 km/h (140 mph)	920 hPa (27.17 inHg)	Northern Territory, Western Australia	None	None	
Agnes	16–22 April 1995	Category 4 severe tropical cyclone	185 km/h (115 mph)	945 hPa (27.91 inHg)	None	None	None	
Frank	6–13 December 1995	Category 4 severe tropical cyclone	175 km/h (110 mph)	950 hPa (28.05 inHg)	Western Australia	Minor	None	
Gertie	17–22 December 1995	Category 3 severe tropical cyclone	140 km/h (85 mph)	965 hPa (28.50 inHg)	Australia		None	
Barry	4–7 January 1996	Category 4 severe tropical cyclone	185 km/h (115 mph)	950 hPa (28.05 inHg)	Queensland	None	None	
Celeste	26–29 January 1996	Category 3 severe tropical cyclone	130 km/h (80 mph)	965 hPa (28.50 inHg)	Queensland		None	
Ethel	7–13 March 1996	Category 2 tropical cyclone	100 km/h (65 mph)	982 hPa (29.00 inHg)	Queensland, Northern Territory		None	
Kirsty	7–14 March 1996	Category 4 severe tropical cyclone	185 km/h (115 mph)	935 hPa (27.61 inHg)	Western Australia		None	
Olivia	5–12 April 1996	Category 4 severe tropical cyclone	195 km/h (120 mph)	925 hPa (27.32 inHg)	Western Australia, South Australia		None	
Lindsay	9–13 July 1996	Category 1 tropical cyclone	75 km/h (45 mph)	990 hPa (29.23 inHg)	None	None	None	
Fergus	23 December 1996 – 1 January 1997	Category 3 severe tropical cyclone	155 km/h (100 mph)	955 hPa (28.20 inHg)	Solomon Islands, New Zealand		4	
Rachel	3–8 January 1997	Category 3 severe tropical cyclone	130 km/h (80 mph)	965 hPa (28.50 inHg)	Northern Territory, Western Australia	Minor	None	
Justin	6–24 March 1997	Category 3 severe tropical cyclone	150 km/h (90 mph)	955 hPa (28.20 inHg)	Papua New Guinea, Queensland	$190 million	37	
Rhonda	11–17 May 1997	Category 4 severe tropical cyclone	175 km/h (110 mph)	935 hPa (27.61 inHg)	Cocos Islands, Western Australia	None	None	
Katrina	1–25 January 1998	Category 4 severe tropical cyclone	165 km/h (105 mph)	940 hPa (27.76 inHg)	Solomon Islands, Vanuatu, Queensland	$8.66 million	2	
Sid	24–29 December 1997	Category 1 tropical cyclone	85 km/h (50 mph)	985 hPa (29.09 inHg)	Northern Territory	$100 million	1	
Thelma	3–15 December 1998	Category 5 severe tropical cyclone	220 km/h (140 mph)	920 hPa (27.17 inHg)	Northern Territory, Western Australia		1	
Rona	10–21 February 1999	Category 3 severe tropical cyclone	140 km/h (85 mph)	970 hPa (28.64 inHg)	Eastern Australia, New Caledonia	$150 million	7	
Vance	16–23 March 1999	Category 5 severe tropical cyclone	220 km/h (140 mph)	910 hPa (26.87 inHg)	Northern Territory, Western Australia	-$303 million	None	
Elaine	16–20 March 1999	Category 4 severe tropical cyclone	165 km/h (105 mph)	945 hPa (27.91 inHg)	Western Australia		None	
Gwenda	2–8 April 1999	Category 5 severe tropical cyclone	220 km/h (140 mph)	900 hPa (26.58 inHg)	Western Australia	Minimal	None	
John	10–15 December 1999	Category 5 severe tropical cyclone	205 km/h (125 mph)	915 hPa (27.02 inHg)	Western Australia	$300 million	None	

=== 2000s ===
Name	Dates	Peak intensity			Areas affected	Damage (USD)	Deaths	Ref(s).
Name	Dates	Category	Wind speed	Pressure	Areas affected	Damage (USD)	Deaths	Ref(s).
Steve	25 February – 11 March 2000	Category 2 tropical cyclone	110 km/h (70 mph)	975 hPa (28.79 inHg)	Northern Australia, Western Australia	$90 million	1	
Tessi	1–3 April 2000	Category 3 severe tropical cyclone	130 km/h (80 mph)	980 hPa (28.94 inHg)	Queensland	$60 million	None	
Rosita	17–21 April 2000	Category 5 severe tropical cyclone	215 km/h (130 mph)	930 hPa (27.46 inHg)	Western Australia		None	
Sam	28 November – 10 December 2000	Category 5 severe tropical cyclone	205 km/h (125 mph)	935 hPa (27.61 inHg)	North-Western Australia		None	
Abigail	24 February – 8 March 2001	Category 3 severe tropical cyclone	120 km/h (75 mph)	970 hPa (28.64 inHg)	Northern Territory, Queensland		None	
Chris	02–06 February 2002	Category 5 severe tropical cyclone	205 km/h (125 mph)	915 hPa (27.02 inHg)	Indonesia, Western Australia	$920,000	12	
Upia	21–29 May 2002	Category 1 tropical cyclone	65 km/h (40 mph)	995 hPa (29.38 inHg)	Papua New Guinea	Unknown	Unknown	
Erica	1–17 March 2003	Category 5 severe tropical cyclone	215 km/h (130 mph)	915 hPa (27.02 inHg)	Queensland, New Caledonia		None	
Graham	27 February – 1 March 2003	Category 1 tropical cyclone	75 km/h (45 mph)	985 hPa (29.09 inHg)	Western Australia	Unknown	1	
Inigo	31 March – 8 April 2003	Category 5 severe tropical cyclone	230 km/h (145 mph)	900 hPa (26.58 inHg)	Indonesia, Western Australia	$6 million	58	
Epi	5–6 June 2003	Category 1 tropical cyclone	65 km/h (40 mph)	993 hPa (29.32 inHg)	Papua New Guinea	Unknown	Unknown	
Monty	25 February – 3 March 2004	Category 4 severe tropical cyclone	185 km/h (115 mph)	935 hPa (27.61 inHg)	Western Australia		None	
Fay	12–28 March 2004	Category 5 severe tropical cyclone	215 km/h (130 mph)	920 hPa (27.17 inHg)	North-Western Australia		None	
Harvey	3–7 February 2005	Category 3 severe tropical cyclone	140 km/h (85 mph)	967 hPa (28.56 inHg)	Northern Territory		None	
Ingrid	4–16 March 2005	Category 5 severe tropical cyclone	230 km/h (145 mph)	924 hPa (27.29 inHg)	Papua New Guinea, Northern Australia		None	
Clare	6–10 January 2006	Category 3 severe tropical cyclone	140 km/h (85 mph)	960 hPa (28.35 inHg)	Western Australia	$2.35 million	None	
Larry	15–20 March 2006	Category 4 severe tropical cyclone	185 km/h (115 mph)	935 hPa (27.61 inHg)	Queensland	$1.18 billion	None	
Glenda	22–31 March 2006	Category 5 severe tropical cyclone	205 km/h (125 mph)	910 hPa (26.87 inHg)	Western Australia	$965,000	None	
Monica	16–27 April 2006	Category 5 severe tropical cyclone	250 km/h (155 mph)	916 hPa (27.05 inHg)	Queensland, Northern Territory	$5.1 million	None	
George	27 February – 11 March 2007	Category 5 severe tropical cyclone	205 km/h (125 mph)	902 hPa (26.64 inHg)	North-Western Australia	$100 million	2	
Guba	11-20 November 2007	Category 3 severe tropical cyclone	120 km/h (75 mph)	971 hPa (28.67 inHg)	Papua New Guinea	$71.4 million	149	
Helen	1–7 January 2008	Category 2 tropical cyclone	95 km/h (60 mph)	975 hPa (28.79 inHg)	Northern Territory		1	
Durga	20–26 April 2008	Category 2 tropical cyclone	95 km/h (60 mph)	988 hPa (29.18 inHg)	None	None	None	
Hamish	4–14 March 2009	Category 5 tropical cyclone	215 km/h (130 mph)	924 hPa (27.29 inHg)	Queensland	$38 million	2	
Laurence	8–23 December 2009	Category 5 severe tropical cyclone	205 km/h (125 mph)	925 hPa (27.32 inHg)	Western Australia	$8.9 million	None	

=== 2010s ===
Name	Dates	Peak intensity			Areas affected	Damage (USD)	Deaths	Ref(s).
Name	Dates	Category	Wind speed	Pressure	Areas affected	Damage (USD)	Deaths	Ref(s).
Magda	18–24 January 2010	Category 3 severe tropical cyclone	130 km/h (80 mph)	975 hPa (28.79 inHg)	Western Australia	Minor	None	
Tasha	20 — 25 December 2010	Category 1 tropical cyclone	75 km/h (45 mph)	993 hPa (29.32 inHg)	Queensland	Unknown	1	
Carlos	12–27 February 2011	Category 3 severe tropical cyclone	120 km/h (75 mph)	969 hPa (28.61 inHg)	Northern Territory, Western Australia	$12.3 million	None	
Heidi	9–13 January 2012	Category 3 severe tropical cyclone	150 km/h (90 mph)	960 hPa (28.35 inHg)	Western Australia	Minimal	None	
Jasmine	31 January – 16 February 2012	Category 4 severe tropical cyclone	195 km/h (120 mph)	937 hPa (27.67 inHg)	Vanuatu, New Caledonia, Tonga			
Lua	10–18 March 2012	Category 3 severe tropical cyclone	155 km/h (100 mph)	935 hPa (27.61 inHg)	Western Australia	$230 million	None	
Oswald	17–29 January 2013	Category 1 tropical cyclone	65 km/h (40 mph)	991 hPa (29.26 inHg)	Eastern Australia	$2.28 billion	6	
Rusty	22–28 February 2013	Category 4 severe tropical cyclone	165 km/h (105 mph)	944 hPa (27.88 inHg)	Western Australia	$510 million	None	
Christine	25 December 2013 – 1 January 2014	Category 4 severe tropical cyclone	165 km/h (105 mph)	948 hPa (27.99 inHg)	Western Australia	Minor	None	
Ita	1–14 April 2014	Category 5 severe tropical cyclone	215 km/h (130 mph)	922 hPa (27.23 inHg)	Solomon Islands, Queensland; Papua New Guinea, New Zealand	$1.15 billion	22	(Note: Insurance claims in New Zealand associated with the remnants of Severe Tropical Cyclone Ita amounted to NZ$55.3 million. According to the Oanda Corporations currency converter this amounts to US$47.9 million.) (Note: EM-DAT provides a damage estimate of US$24 million for Cyclone Ita's damage to the Solomon Islands. According to the Oanda Corporations currency converter this amounts to around AU$25 million.)
Lam	12–20 February 2015	Category 4 severe tropical cyclone	185 km/h (115 mph)	943 hPa (27.85 inHg)	Northern Australia	$64.4 million	None	
Marcia	15–26 February 2015	Category 5 severe tropical cyclone	205 km/h (125 mph)	932 hPa (27.52 inHg)	Queensland	$591 million	None	
Olwyn	8–14 April 2015	Category 3 severe tropical cyclone	140 km/h (85 mph)	955 hPa (28.20 inHg)	Western Australia	$76.3 million	None	
Quang	27 April – 1 May 2015	Category 4 severe tropical cyclone	185 km/h (115 mph)	950 hPa (28.05 inHg)	Western Australia	Minimal	None	
Debbie	23 March – 7 April 2017	Category 4 severe tropical cyclone	195 km/h (120 mph)	943 hPa (27.85 inHg)	Queensland	$2.67 billion	14	
Marcus	14–27 March 2018	Category 5 severe tropical cyclone	230 km/h (145 mph)	905 hPa (26.72 inHg)	Northern Territory, Western Australia	$75 million	None	
Trevor	15–26 March 2019	Category 4 severe tropical cyclone	175 km/h (110 mph)	950 hPa (28.05 inHg)	Queensland, Northern Territory	>$750,000	None	
Veronica	18–31 March 2019	Category 5 severe tropical cyclone	215 km/h (130 mph)	928 hPa (27.40 inHg)	Western Australia	$1.65 billion	None	

=== 2020s ===
Name	Dates	Peak intensity			Areas affected	Damage (USD)	Deaths	Ref(s).
Name	Dates	Category	Wind speed	Pressure	Areas affected	Damage (USD)	Deaths	Ref(s).
Damien	3–9 February 2020	Category 3 severe tropical cyclone	150 km/h (90 mph)	955 hPa (28.20 inHg)	Western Australia	$6 million	None	
Harold	1–11 April 2020	Category 5 severe tropical cyclone	230 km/h (145 mph)	920 hPa (27.17 inHg)	Papua New Guinea, Solomon Islands, Vanuatu, Fiji, Tonga	$768 million	≥30	
Mangga	19 – 23 May 2020	Tropical low	55 km/h (35 mph)	996 hPa (29.41 inHg)	Western Australia	Unknown	Unknown	
Seroja	3–12 April 2021	Category 3 severe tropical cyclone	120 km/h (75 mph)	971 hPa (28.67 inHg)	Indonesia, East Timor, Western Australia	$491 million	272	
Seth	24 December 2021 – 6 January 2022	Category 2 tropical cyclone	110 km/h (70 mph)	983 hPa (29.03 inHg)	Northern Territory, Queensland	$75 million	4	
Freddy	4 – 14 February 2023	Category 4 severe tropical cyclone	175 km/h (110 mph)	951 hPa (28.08 inHg)	Mascarene Islands, Madagascar, Mozambique, Zimbabwe, Malawi	$1.53 billion	1,434	
Gabrielle	10 – 11 February 2023	Category 3 severe tropical cyclone	155 km/h (100 mph)	958 hPa (28.29 inHg)	Norfolk Island, New Zealand	$9.2 billion	11 (1)	
Ilsa	5–16 April 2023	Category 5 severe tropical cyclone	230 km/h (145 mph)	915 hPa (27.02 inHg)	Indonesia, Northern Territory, Western Australia	$10.2 million	8	
Jasper	4–18 December 2023	Category 5 severe tropical cyclone	215 km/h (130 mph)	926 hPa (27.34 inHg)	Solomon Islands, Queensland	$675 million	1	
Kirrily	12 January–4 February 2024	Category 3 severe tropical cyclone	120 km/h (75 mph)	978 hPa (28.88 inHg)	Queensland, Northern Territory, South Australia, New South Wales	$120 million	None	
Megan	13–24 March 2024	Category 4 severe tropical cyclone	165 km/h (105 mph)	955 hPa (28.20 inHg)	Queensland, Northern Territory	Unknown	None	
Zelia	8–14 February 2025	Category 5 severe tropical cyclone	215 km/h (130 mph)	927 hPa (27.37 inHg)	Western Australia	$733 million	None	
Alfred	21 February–9 March 2025	Category 4 severe tropical cyclone	165 km/h (105 mph)	954 hPa (28.17 inHg)	Queensland, New South Wales	$1.18 billion	1	
Maila	1-10 April 2026	Category 5 severe tropical cyclone	215 km/h (130 mph)	924 hPa (27.29 inHg)	Solomon Islands, Papua New Guinea	Unknown	25+	

== Retired names sorted by letter ==
Letter	Number of retired names	Retired names	Last addition
A	11	Abigail, Ada, Adel, Agi, Agnes, Aivu, Alby, Alfred, Althea, Annette, Audrey	2025 (Alfred)
B	3	Barry, Beth, Bobby	1996 (Barry)
C	7	Carlos, Charlie, Chloe, Chris, Christine, Clare, Cliff, Connie	2013 (Christine)
D	9	Daisy, Damien, Daphne, Debbie, Delilah, Dinah, Dominic, Dora, Durga	2020 (Damien)
E	7	Elaine, Elinor, Elsie, Emily, Epi, Erica, Ethel	2003 (Epi)
F	9	Fay, Felcity, Fergus, Fifi, Fina, Fiona, Flora, Frank, Freddy	2026 (Fina)
G	7	Gabrielle, George, Gertie, Glenda, Graham, Guba, Gwenda	2023 (Gabrielle)
H	6	Hamish, Harold, Harvey, Heidi, Helen, Herbie	2020 (Harold)
I	7	Ian, Ilona, Ilsa, Ingrid, Inigo, Ita, Ivor	2023 (Ilsa)
J	8	Jane, Jasmine, Jason, Jasper, Joan, John, Joy, Justin	2023 (Jasper)
K	4	Kathy, Katrina, Kirrily, Kirsty	2024 (Kirrily)
L	7	Lam, Lance, Larry, Laurence, Lena, Lindsay, Lua	2015 (Lam)
M	12	Madge, Magda, Maila, Mangga, Manu, Marcia, Marcus, Margot, Mark, Megan, Monica, Monty	2026 (Maila)
N	5	Narelle, Naomi, Ned, Nigel, Nina	2026 (Narelle)
O	2	Oliver, Olivia, Olwyn, Orson, Oswald	2015 (Olwyn)
P	2	Pearl, Pedro	1994 (Pearl)
Q	2	Quang, Quenton	2015 (Quang)
R	6	Rachel, Rhonda, Roger, Rona, Rosita, Rusty	2013 (Rusty)
S	7	Sandy, Seroja, Seth, Sharon, Sid, Simon, Steve	2022 (Seth)
T	8	Tasha, Ted, Tessi, Thelma, Theodore, Tina, Tracy, Trevor, Trixie	2019 (Trevor)
U	1	Upia	2002
V	2	Vance, Veronica, Violet	2019 (Veronica)
W	3	Wanda, Warren, Winifred	1995 (Warren)
Z	1	Zelia	2025

== See also ==
- List of retired Atlantic hurricane names
- List of retired Pacific hurricane names
- List of retired Pacific typhoon names
- List of retired Philippine typhoon names
- List of retired South Pacific cyclone names
