= Cyclone Helen =

Cyclone Helen may refer to:

- Cyclone Helen (2007)
- Cyclone Helen (2013)
