= Cyclone Ilsa =

Category 5 Australian region cyclone in 2023

Severe Tropical Cyclone Ilsa
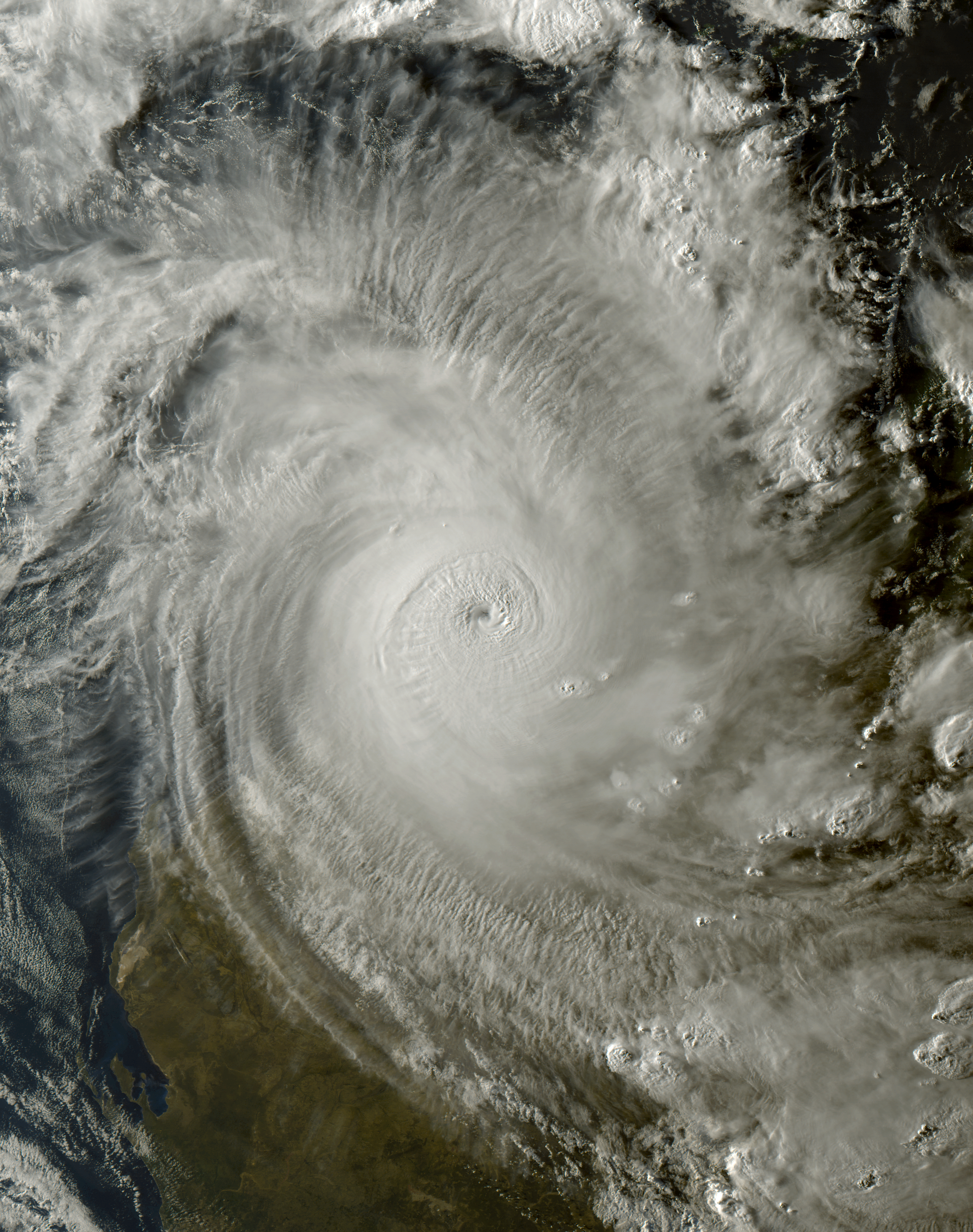
- Ilsa near peak intensity while approaching Western Australia on 13 April

Meteorological history
- Formed: 6 April 2023
- Dissipated: 15 April 2023

Category 5 severe tropical cyclone
- 10-minute sustained (Aus)
- Highest winds: 230 km/h (145 mph)
- Highest gusts: 325 km/h (200 mph)
- Lowest pressure: 930 hPa (mbar); 27.46 inHg

Category 5-equivalent tropical cyclone
- 1-minute sustained (SSHWS/JTWC)
- Highest winds: 260 km/h (160 mph)
- Lowest pressure: 920 hPa (mbar); 27.17 inHg

Overall effects
- Fatalities: 8
- Damage: ≥$10.2 million (2023 USD)
- Areas affected: Maluku, Lesser Sunda Islands, Northern Territory, Western Australia
- Part of the 2022–23 Australian region cyclone season

Severe Tropical Cyclone Ilsa was a powerful tropical cyclone that struck Western Australia in April 2023. The sixth named storm, and the fifth severe tropical cyclone of the 2022–23 Australian region cyclone season, Ilsa formed from a tropical low off the coast of Indonesia on 6 April. It fluctuated in intensity and became a Category 1 tropical cyclone on 11 April, after deep convection became symmetric around the low-level circulation center. Ilsa then rapidly intensified the following day and reached its peak intensity as a Category 5 severe tropical cyclone on the Australian tropical cyclone intensity scale. Ten-minute sustained winds were estimated as 230 km/h (145 mph), with a central barometric pressure of 930 hPa (27.46 inHg). One-minute sustained winds reached 260 km/h (160 mph) at this time, equivalent to a Category 5 hurricane on the Saffir–Simpson hurricane wind scale. Additionally, record-breaking ten-minute sustained wind speed of 219 km/h (136 mph) were measured at Bedout Island, beating the previous record of Cyclone George in 2007. Ilsa made landfall roughly 120 km (75 mi) northeast of Port Hedland, Western Australia. Inland, Ilsa weakened to a low-end tropical cyclone with 85 km/h (50 mph) winds. Overall, Ilsa caused over US$10 million in damage, and caused 8 deaths after two boats capsized off the coast of Western Australia.

== Meteorological history ==
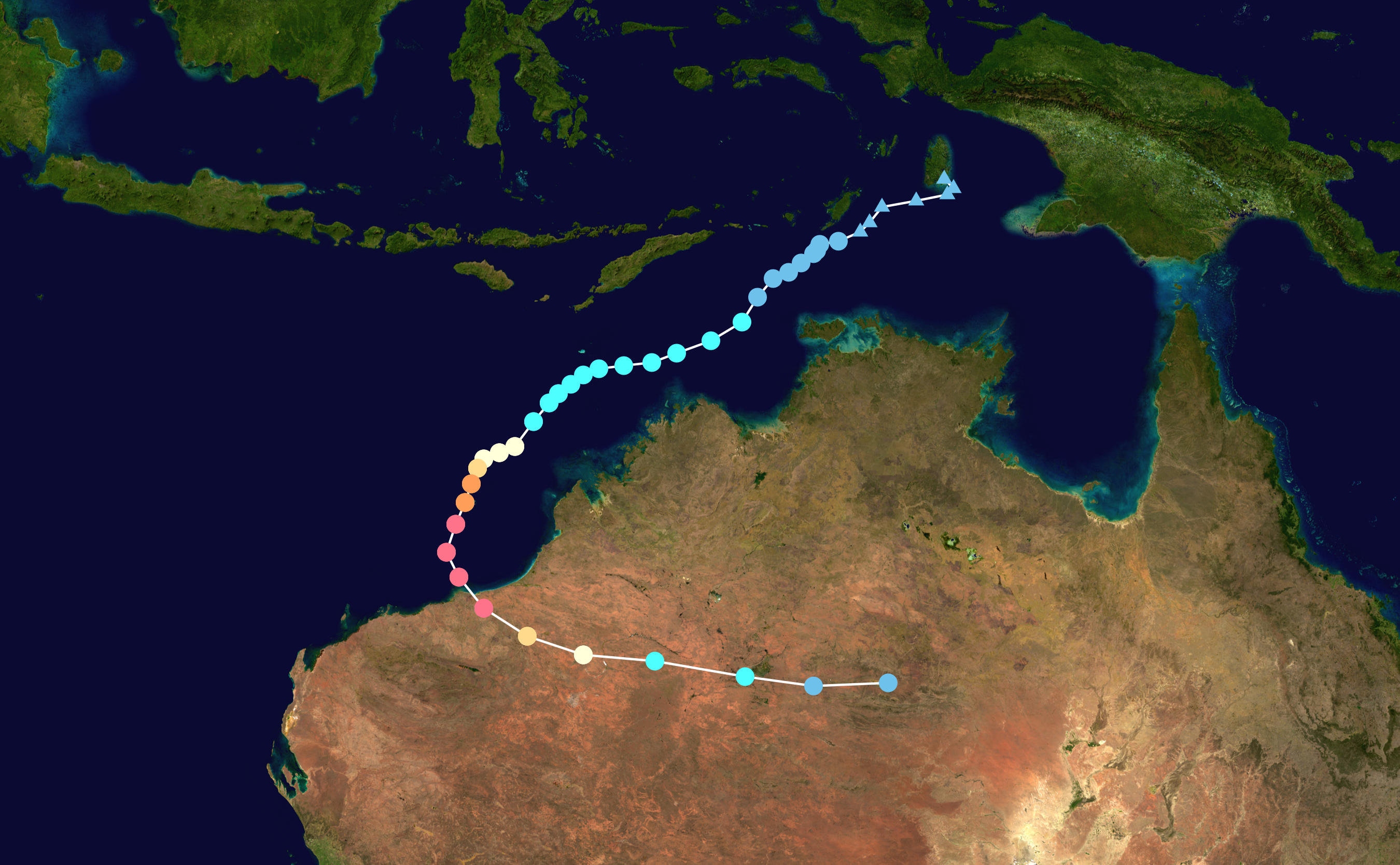
Map plotting the storm's track and intensity, according to the Saffir–Simpson scale (Note: The position of Ilsa's Category 5 peak is not depicted in this graphic as it is an asynoptic point (i.e. not at the 6-hour intervals of all other points) occurring at 09:00 UTC 13 April.) Map key Saffir–Simpson scale Tropical depression (≤38 mph, ≤62 km/h) Tropical storm (39–73 mph, 63–118 km/h) Category 1 (74–95 mph, 119–153 km/h) Category 2 (96–110 mph, 154–177 km/h) Category 3 (111–129 mph, 178–208 km/h) Category 4 (130–156 mph, 209–251 km/h) Category 5 (≥157 mph, ≥252 km/h) Unknown Storm type Tropical cyclone Subtropical cyclone Extratropical cyclone, remnant low, tropical disturbance, or monsoon depression

An active burst of the Madden–Julian oscillation in conjunction with a westward-propagating equatorial Rossby wave led to the formation of a tropical low on 6 April. The low—designated 23U by the Bureau of Meteorology (BoM)—slowly moved southwest around a mid-level ridge above north-eastern Australia, as convection persisted near the system's circulation. By the next day, the Joint Typhoon Warning Center (JTWC) issued a Tropical Cyclone Formation Alert on the system, citing the slightly favourable environmental conditions encompassing poleward outflow and warm sea surface temperatures (SST) of 29–30 °C (84–86 °F) subduing high vertical wind shear. Convection continued to strengthen west of the exposed low-level circulation centre (LLCC) as it scattered under a strong temperature gradient. During the following day, the JTWC initiated advisories on the system and classified it as Tropical Cyclone 18S.

More consolidation took place, with spiral rainbands present in all quadrants of the storm wrapping around the LLCC obscured by a cold dense overcast (CDO). Easterly wind shear decreased as a result of the intense convective mass causing upper-level winds around it. Over the subsequent days, the low steadily drifted to the southwest, but due to a surge of unfavourable wind shear, intensification was delayed. However, levels of wind shear later diminished, and by late on 11 April, the BoM reported that the symmetrical tropical low had developed into a Category 1 tropical cyclone and named it Ilsa. The expanding CDO completely obscured the circulation as westerly dry air attempted to enter the system from the north. Consequently, Ilsa became a Category 1-equivalent tropical cyclone on the Saffir–Simpson scale (SSHWS). A burst of convection occurred near Ilsa's center, and the BoM reported that it briefly strengthened into a Category 2 cyclone. On the same day, Ilsa rapidly intensified into a Category 3 severe tropical cyclone within a favourable environment of low shear and warm SST. Ilsa then underwent steady intensification under persistent wind shear, as SST and ocean heat content increased along the way, with cloud top temperatures of at least −92 °C (−134 °F). A mid-level trough passed south of the system, eroding the steering ridge, and by 12 April, Ilsa changed course to be more southerly.

Ilsa displayed an eye feature in microwave imaging, with vortical hot towers indicating eye development. The eye in the symmetric system later became visible on satellite imagery as rainbands tightened after intensifying to a Category 3-equivalent tropical cyclone. Later the next day, the BoM assessed the storm to have attained ten-minute sustained winds of 165 km/h (105 mph), ranking it as a Category 4 severe tropical cyclone. Owing to the substantial radial outflow and very warm SST, despite moderate wind shear, Ilsa intensified into a Category 4-equivalent tropical cyclone on the SSHWS. Later that day, Ilsa strengthened further to its peak intensity as a Category 5-equivalent tropical cyclone with 1-minute sustained winds of 260 km/h (160 mph). An automated weather station on Rowley Shoals recorded wind gusts up to 235 km/h (146 mph). Later that same day, Ilsa had become a Category 5 severe tropical cyclone with sustained winds of 230 km/h (145 mph) and the lowest atmospheric pressure of 930 hPa (27.46 inHg). Around that time, the eye was measured from its initial 41 km (25 mi) to 26 km (16 mi).

Ilsa made landfall in a coast 120 km (75 mi) east-northeast of Port Hedland, with 10-minute sustained winds of 215 km/h (130 mph). Following this, the JTWC discontinued the issuing of advisories of Ilsa, as the storm accelerated inland and rapidly deteriorated from land interaction and high vertical wind shear. While over Western Australia, Ilsa weakened to a Category 4 severe tropical cyclone with 175 km/h (110 mph) winds. The storm continued to weaken with a deteriorating cloud signature. During 14 April, another mid-level trough enhanced over Western Australia, steering Ilsa south then southeast. Ilsa fell below tropical cyclone strength at 12:00 UTC. Ilsa was last noted on 15 April, with its remnants moving east before dissipating over Central Australia.

== Preparations and impact ==
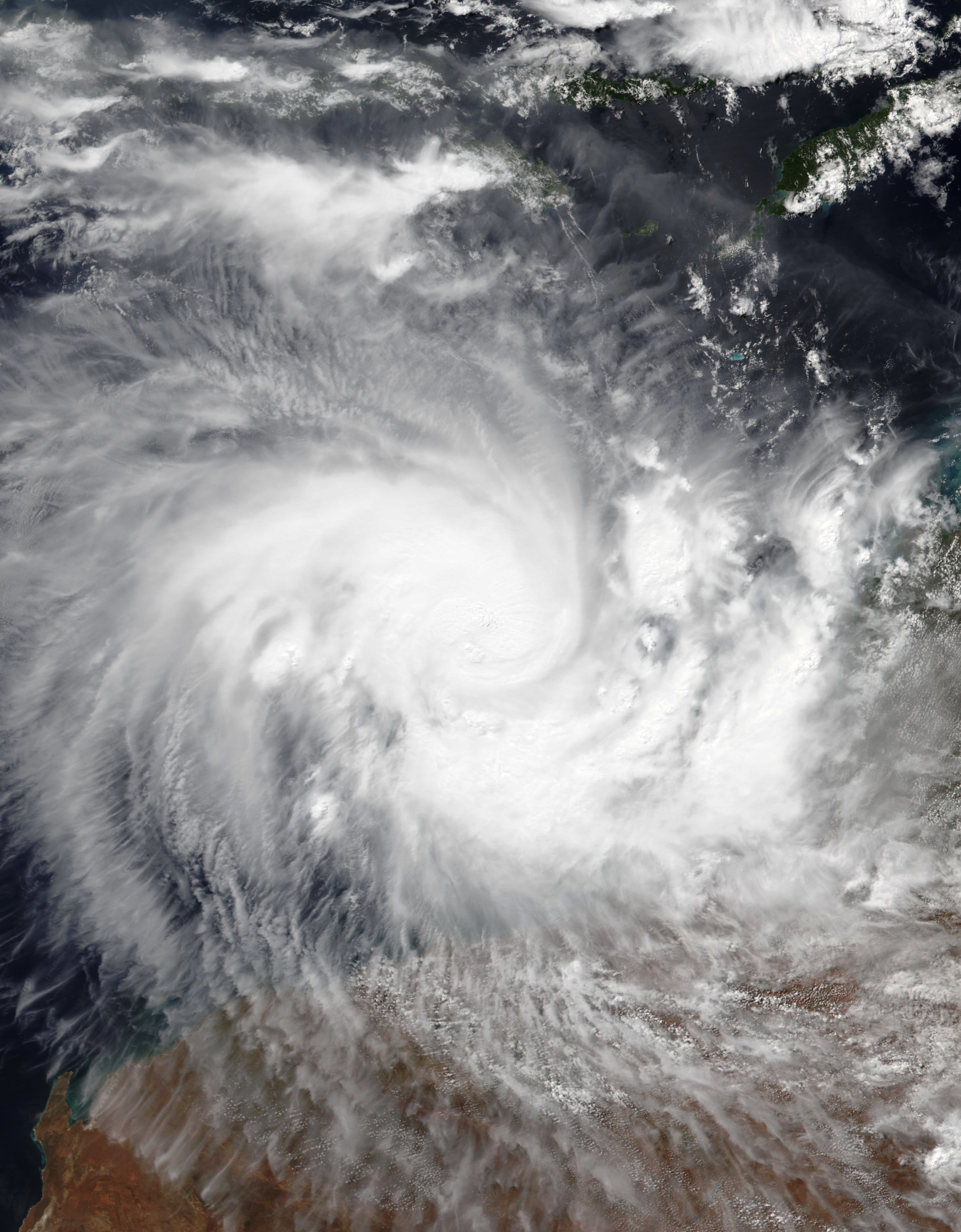
Cyclone Ilsa continuing to intensify off the coast of Western Australia on 12 April

Gale-force winds with gusts up to 165 km/h (105 mph), and heavy rain might occur on 9 April between Kalumburu and Kuri Bay in the state's north. Squally thunderstorms are also anticipated in far northern Kimberley. Residents across the coast of Pilbara evacuated as high tides, large waves and inundation were possible, along with a highway closure along the Pilbara coast. In anticipation of Ilsa, the BoM issued a warning for Western Australia’s Kimberley and Pilbara regions.

Additional emergency workers, aircraft and essential supplies have also been sent to the region. On 12 April, the Department of Fire and Emergency Services (DFES) issued a cyclone yellow alert, and urged residents to be prudent and to take action and prepare to shelter. At least 700 residents were being evacuated to cyclone shelters prior to the storm. Port Hedland mayor Peter Carter said damaging winds could turn flying debris into "missiles in the air".

Western Australia's Emergency Department on 15 April assessed damage from Ilsa, with at least eight personnel were sent to the Great Northern Highway fires near Pippingarra. The manager of Pardoo Station claimed that the estimated damage was at least A$15 million (US$10.2 million). Five accommodation sheds were entirely blown away by the storm at the Pardoo Roadhouse, and emergency officials have been unable to locate them. The Roadhouse suffered an estimated AU$4 million in damage, with the roof being torn off and recently-installed solar panels being blown away during the cyclone. The Roadhouse reopened for business in March 2024. Apart from Pardoo, acting emergency services minister Sue Ellery said that the damage caused by Ilsa was "fairly minimal."

Two boats containing 19 men total illegally fishing off the coast of Western Australia were caught in the cyclone. One of the boats was found shipwrecked on Bedwell Island, while the other boat sank. The 11 people on the shipwrecked boat were rescued, while one survivor was found from the sunken boat. The other 8 fishermen died.

== Retirement ==
As a result of the damage associated with the storm, the name Ilsa was removed from the list of Australian region cyclone names and will never be used again for a tropical cyclone in that basin. It was replaced by Isabella for future seasons.

== See also ==
- Tropical cyclones in 2023
- Weather of 2023
- Cyclone Ilona (1988)
- Cyclone Orson (1989) – a powerful tropical cyclone that had a similar path and intensity.
- Cyclone John (1999)
- Cyclone George (2007)
- Cyclone Laurence (2009)
- Cyclones Heidi and Lua (2012) – two severe tropical cyclones which both made landfall around Pardoo within the span of two months.
- Cyclone Kelvin (2018) – the previous severe tropical cyclone to make landfall between Broome and Port Hedland prior to Ilsa.
- Cyclone Zelia (2025) – powerful tropical cyclone that had a similar path and intensity.
