= Cyclone Ilona =

Category 2 Australian region cyclone

Severe Tropical Cyclone Ilona
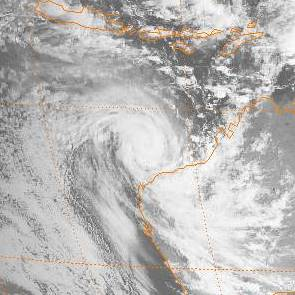
- Cyclone Ilona at peak intensity on 17 December

Meteorological history
- Formed: 12 December 1988
- Dissipated: 19 December 1988

Category 3 severe tropical cyclone
- 10-minute sustained (BOM)
- Highest winds: 130 km/h (80 mph)
- Lowest pressure: 960 hPa (mbar); 28.35 inHg

Category 2-equivalent tropical cyclone
- 1-minute sustained (SSHWS/JTWC)
- Highest winds: 155 km/h (100 mph)

Overall effects
- Fatalities: None reported
- Damage: $725,000 (1988 USD)
- Areas affected: Western Australia
- IBTrACS
- Part of the 1988–89 Australian region cyclone season

Severe Tropical Cyclone Ilona caused moderate damage across the Pilbara region of Western Australia in mid-December 1988. The system originated from a monsoon trough that coalesced into a tropical low over the Timor Sea on 12 December. The system initially moved southwest, before moving on a more westerly course. Steady intensification occurred and Ilona reached its peak strength on 17 December as a low-end severe tropical cyclone. A southward turn directed the cyclone toward Western Australia, and it made landfall near Mardie Station. The system subsequently degraded over land and dissipated on 19 December.

The cyclone's effects were relatively limited, though locally significant damage was reported in areas such as Dampier and Karratha. Several homes lost their roof and downed power lines left towns without power for several days. No casualties were reported, damage amounted to A$1 million (US$725,000), and the name Ilona was retired after the season.

== Meteorological history ==
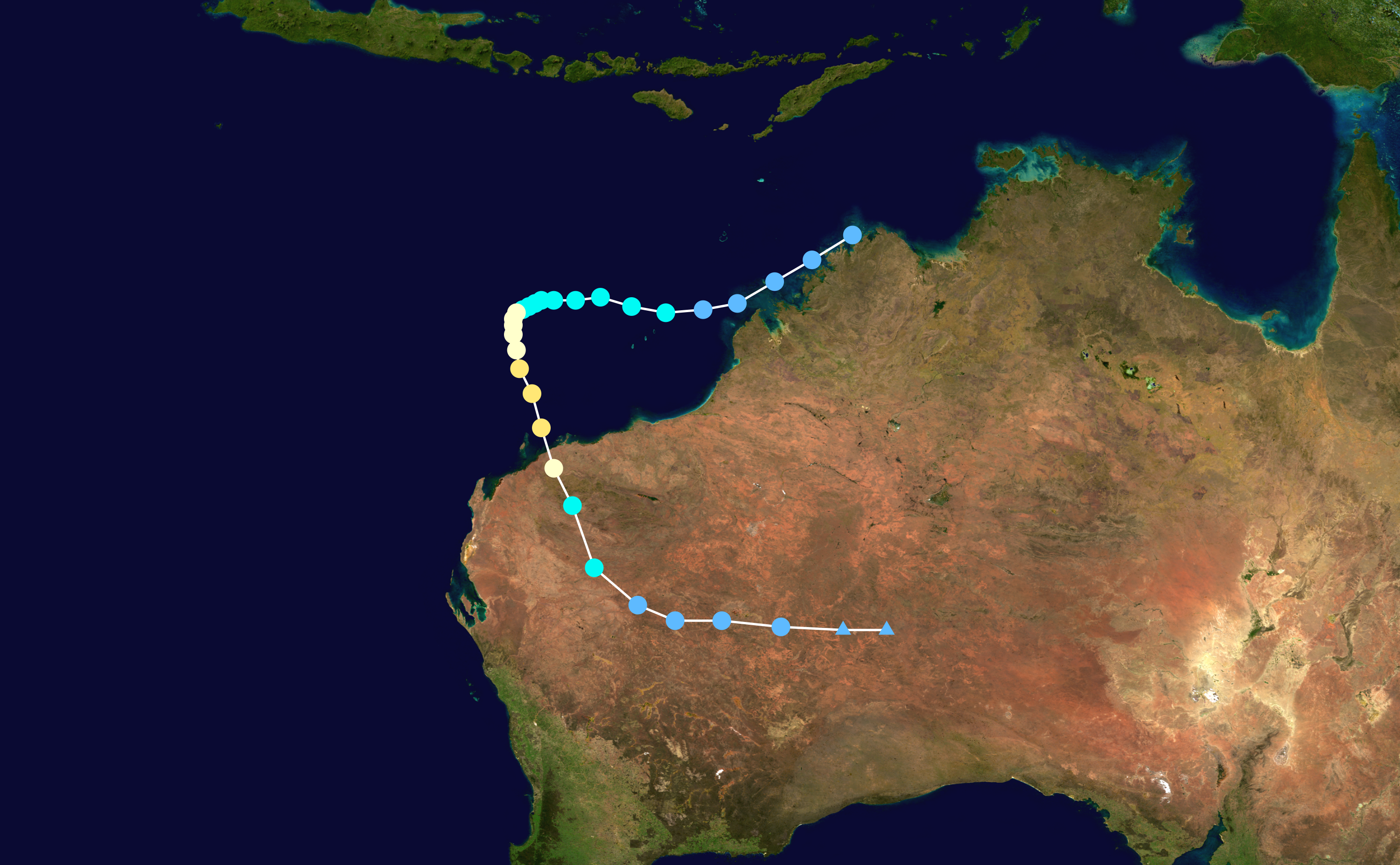
Map plotting the storm's track and intensity, according to the Saffir–Simpson scale Map key Saffir–Simpson scale Tropical depression (≤38 mph, ≤62 km/h) Tropical storm (39–73 mph, 63–118 km/h) Category 1 (74–95 mph, 119–153 km/h) Category 2 (96–110 mph, 154–177 km/h) Category 3 (111–129 mph, 178–208 km/h) Category 4 (130–156 mph, 209–251 km/h) Category 5 (≥157 mph, ≥252 km/h) Unknown Storm type Tropical cyclone Subtropical cyclone Extratropical cyclone, remnant low, tropical disturbance, or monsoon depression

A monsoon trough was noted along the coast of Australia's Northern Territory in late November into early December 1988. This system led to sporadic heavy rain in the region. On 12 December, a tropical low consolidated from the monsoon trough over the Timor Sea, west of Darwin, Northern Territory. Moving southwest, the system skirted the Kimberley coast before turning west. Acquiring gale-force winds by 00:00 UTC on 13 December, the low was classified as a Category 1 tropical cyclone and assigned the name Ilona by the Tropical Cyclone Warning Centre (TCWC) in Perth, Western Australia. At this time it was situated near Adele Island. Twelve hours later, the Joint Typhoon Warning Center (JTWC) also began issuing advisories, dubbing it Tropical Cyclone 03S. Decelerating somewhat, Ilona steadily intensified over the following days and achieved severe tropical cyclone status—having ten-minute sustained winds of at least 118 km/h (73 mph)—around 12:00 UTC on 15 December. Similarly, the JTWC assessed the system to have reached the equivalent of a Category 1 hurricane on the Saffir–Simpson hurricane scale (SSHS) by 18:00 UTC.

Ilona turned south, and later south-southeast, on 15 December and began a steady approach to Western Australia. Slight intensification took place, with the cyclone achieving its peak strength around 00:00 UTC on 17 December with ten-minute sustained winds of 130 km/h (80 mph) and a barometric pressure of 960 hPa (mbar; 28.35 inHg). The JTWC estimated Ilona to be slightly stronger, with maximum one-minute sustained winds of 155 km/h (100 mph)—a Category 2-equivalent on the SSHS. That day, Ilona passed near the North Rankin gas platform. Around 16:00 UTC, the eye of Ilona made landfall near Mardie Station. Around 16:30 UTC, the center of Ilona passed over the town, with a five-minute period of calm observed. An eye passage was also reported in Fortescue Roadhouse. The cyclone rapidly decayed as it accelerated inland, falling below tropical cyclone strength by 00:00 UTC on 19 December, at which time it was situated northeast of Meekatharra. Thereafter, the decaying low turned east and ultimately dissipated later that day just west of the Western Australia–South Australia border.

== Preparations and impact ==
On 15 December, areas across Pilbara were placed on alert for the storm's arrival; however, as the storm continued west, the alert was dropped. The warning was quickly reinstated when forecasts showed Ilona moving south. Officials indicated that residents had roughly 12 hours to fully prepare.

Striking Pilbara as a severe tropical cyclone, Ilona caused significant damage in the region; however, the sparsely populated nature of the region limited the extent of severe damage. Mardie Station was buffeted by hurricane-force winds with gusts up to 174 km/h (108 mph). An unconfirmed report indicated gusts as high as 220 km/h (140 mph). These winds uprooted trees, downed power lines, and tore roofs from homes in multiple locales; extensive damage occurred in Roebourne, Wickham, Dampier, Karratha, Pannawonica, and Tom Price. Homes and caravans sustained damage in Karratha, reportedly the hardest-hit area according to State Emergency Services. Affected areas were without power for several days, and crews from Port Hedland were called in to assist. Heavy rains also accompanied the system, with accumulations exceeding 100 mm (3.9 in) across much of Pilbara, breaking December records at the time; two-day accumulations exceeded 200 mm (7.9 in) in some locations. The rainfall was mostly beneficial to the region. Offshore, the combined effects of Cyclones Ilona and Orson in March 1989 caused tremendous damage to coral reefs—mainly populated by Acropora—in eastern areas of Mermaid Sound. Turbulent waters killed or broke apart 50–100% of the living coral across all sites in the sound. In coastal Dampier, 12 boats sank, capsized, or were washed ashore. Damage amounted to A$1 million (US$725,000).

Though no casualties were reported, the effects of Ilona were deemed severe enough for its name to be retired after the season.

== See also ==
- List of retired Australian cyclone names
- Cyclone Orson
