= Cyclone Helen (2007) =

Category 2 Australian region cyclone in 2008

Tropical Cyclone Helen
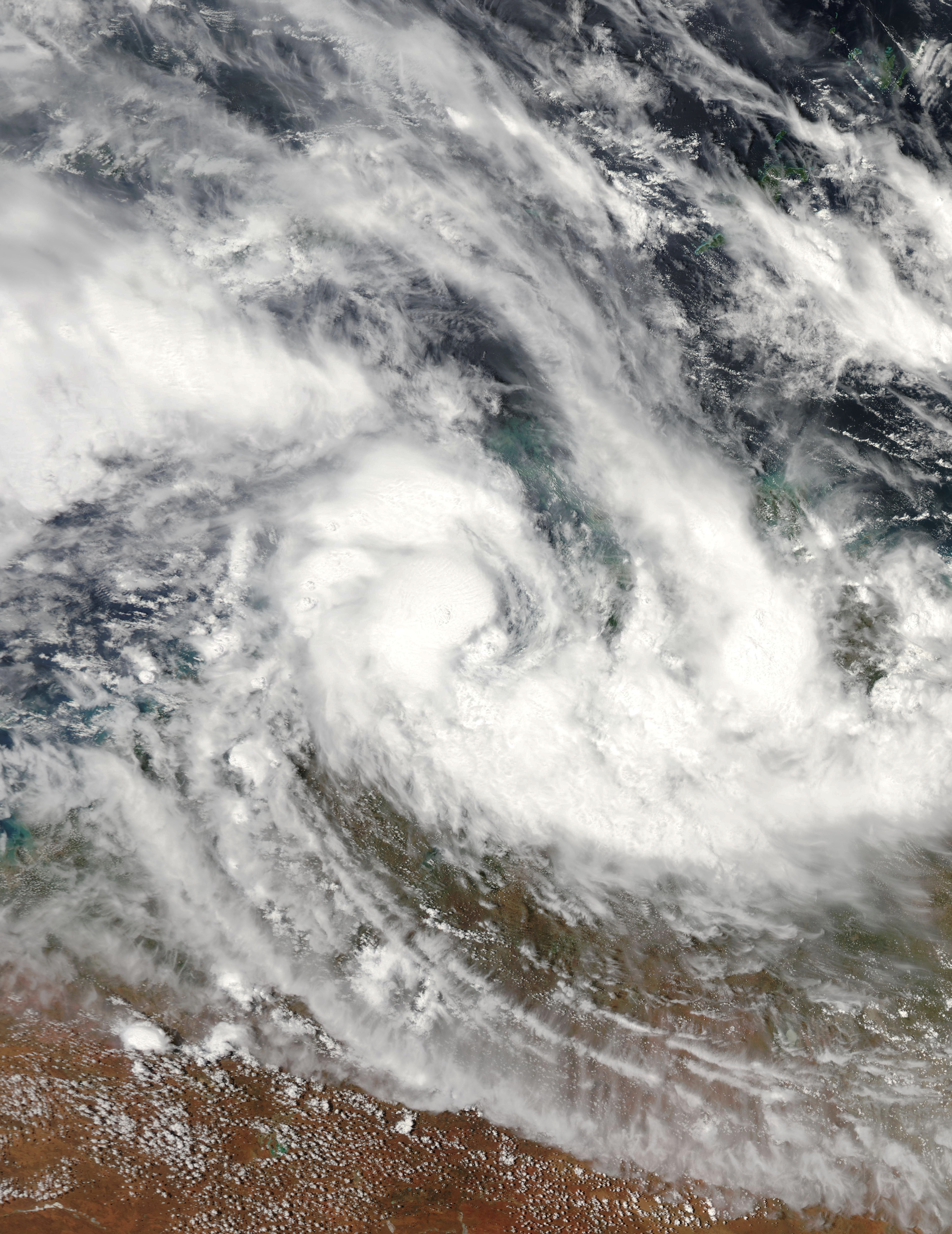
- Tropical Cyclone Helen over the Joseph Bonaparte Gulf on 4 January

Meteorological history
- Formed: 28 December 2007
- Dissipated: 7 January 2008

Category 2 tropical cyclone
- 10-minute sustained (BOM)
- Highest winds: 95 km/h (60 mph)
- Lowest pressure: 975 hPa (mbar); 28.79 inHg

Tropical storm
- 1-minute sustained (SSHWS/JTWC)
- Highest winds: 95 km/h (60 mph)
- Lowest pressure: 985 hPa (mbar); 29.09 inHg

Overall effects
- Fatalities: 1
- Damage: $1.1 million (2007 USD)
- Areas affected: Far North Queensland, Northern Territory, Western Australia
- IBTrACS
- Part of the 2007–08 Australian region cyclone season

Tropical Cyclone Helen was the first tropical cyclone to bring gale-force winds to Darwin, Australia since 1985. The fourth named storm of the 2007–08 Australian region cyclone season, Helen developed out of a weak area of low pressure in late December over the Top End region of Australia. Generally tracking westward, the system eventually intensified into a tropical cyclone and was given the name Helen on 2 January. By this time, it was situated over the Joseph Bonaparte Gulf and was beginning to retrograde eastward. Late on 4 January, the storm made landfall near Channel Point with winds of 95 km/h (60 mph) though rapidly weakened to a tropical low within 12 hours. Gradually accelerating, the remnants of Helen moved over the Gulf of Carpentaria before striking land again on 6 January. The system was last noted over the Cape York Peninsula on 7 January.

From late December through 6 January, Helen and its precursor low produced significant rainfall over the Northern Territory, generally amounting between 100 and 200 mm (3.9 and 7.9 in). One person drowned in the Victoria River after his car was swept away in a flood. As a tropical cyclone, Helen produced significant wind gusts across the Top End, peaking at 120 km/h (75 mph), downing thousands of trees. In Darwin, roughly 15,000 people were without power due to the storm, more than 100 of which remained so four days after the storm. Overall losses from the storm reached A$1.3 million (US$1.1 million) with an additional A$1 million (US$882,000) (Note: Monetary values are in 2008 AUD and USD) in cleanup costs.

== Meteorological history ==
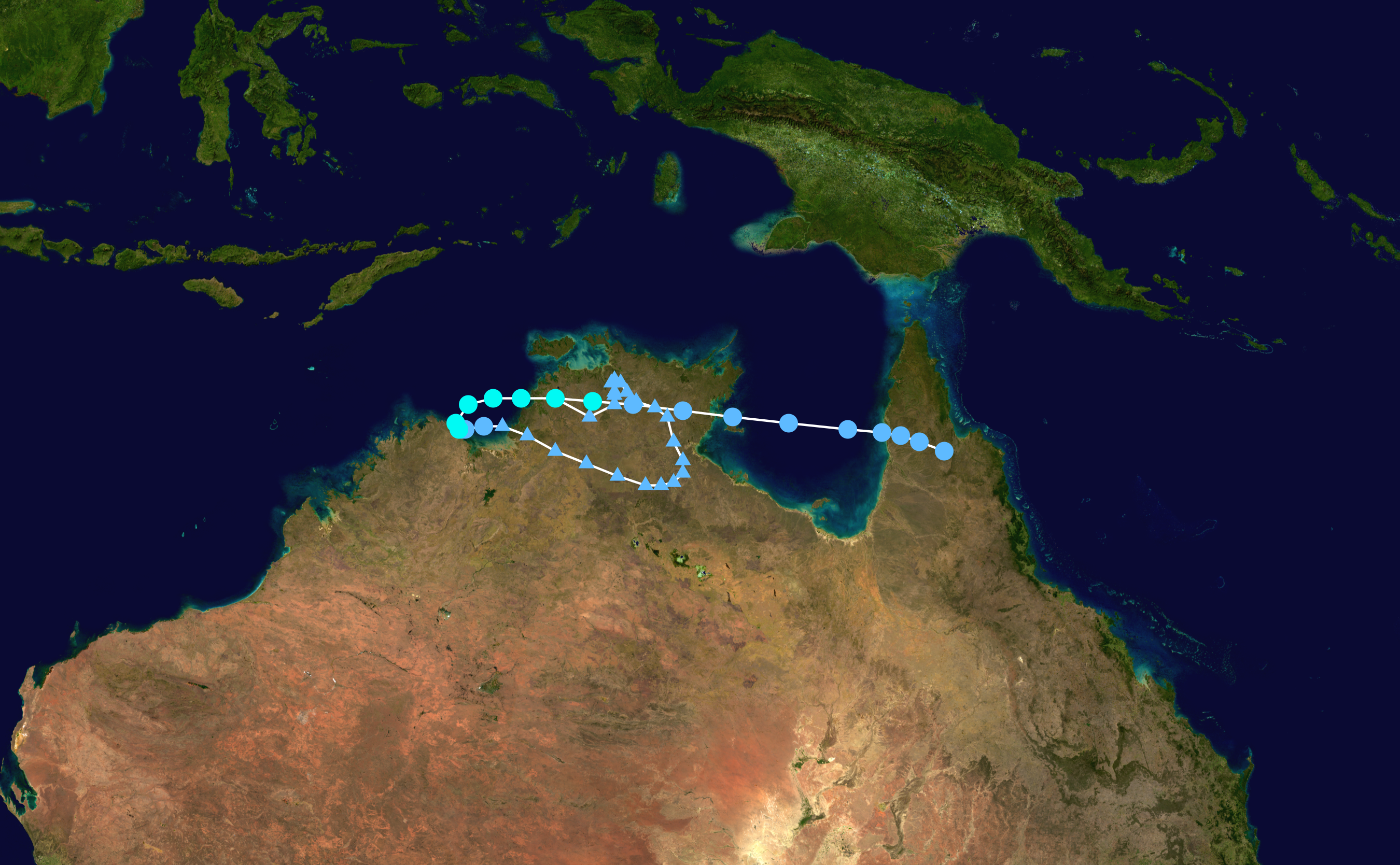
Map plotting the storm's track and intensity, according to the Saffir–Simpson scale Map key Saffir–Simpson scale Tropical depression (≤38 mph, ≤62 km/h) Tropical storm (39–73 mph, 63–118 km/h) Category 1 (74–95 mph, 119–153 km/h) Category 2 (96–110 mph, 154–177 km/h) Category 3 (111–129 mph, 178–208 km/h) Category 4 (130–156 mph, 209–251 km/h) Category 5 (≥157 mph, ≥252 km/h) Unknown Storm type Tropical cyclone Subtropical cyclone Extratropical cyclone, remnant low, tropical disturbance, or monsoon depression

As early as autumn 2007, long-range forecast models indicated that a La Niña would develop by December of that year. In general, this event results in increased sea surface temperatures near Australia. Following this, a strong Madden–Julian oscillation phase took shape, leading to the development of Tropical Cyclone Melanie off the coast of Western Australia and an area of low pressure over the Top End by 28 December. Situated over land, the system initially embedded within a disorganised trough and to intensify as it slowly tracked eastward. By 30 December, it separated itself from the trough and travelled towards the west. The following day, the interaction between the two systems allowed the low to significantly deepen, attaining a barometric pressure of 993 mbar (hPa; 29.32 inHg). This strengthening was short-lived as wind shear over the low increased, displacing convection from its centre.

By 2 January, the weak low moved over the Joseph Bonaparte Gulf where it slowly developed over the following day. Once over water, the Joint Typhoon Warning Center (JTWC) designated the system as Tropical Depression 09S. As organisation improved, a mid-level subtropical ridge over Western Australia pushed the system westward, away from the Kimberley coast. Steadily strengthening, the low attained gale-force winds near its centre during the morning of 4 January and was subsequently named Helen by the Bureau of Meteorology. Shortly thereafter, a strong westerly monsoon flow to the north caused Helen to turn eastward, back towards land. Intensification continued up until landfall, by which time Helen had attained Category 2 status on the Australian tropical cyclone intensity scale. Maximum ten-minute sustained winds reached 95 km/h (60 mph) and the storm's barometric pressure decreased to 975 mbar (hPa; 28.79 inHg). The JTWC assessed Helen to have been slightly weaker, with peak winds estimated at 85 km/h (50 mph).

Around 10:00 pm local time on 4 January, the centre of Tropical Cyclone Helen made landfall near Channel Point. As it moved ashore, the storm developed an eye; however, this feature began breaking apart once overland and the eyewall merged into the system's feeder bands. Roughly 12 hours after landfall, Helen weakened to a tropical low before moving over the Gulf of Carpentaria late on 5 January. Due to an increase in forward motion, the system was unable to regenerate sufficient convection to be reclassified a tropical cyclone before making a second landfall along the Cape York Peninsula. Once overland again, the remnants of Helen abruptly slowed and were last noted on 7 January in the same region.

== Preparations ==
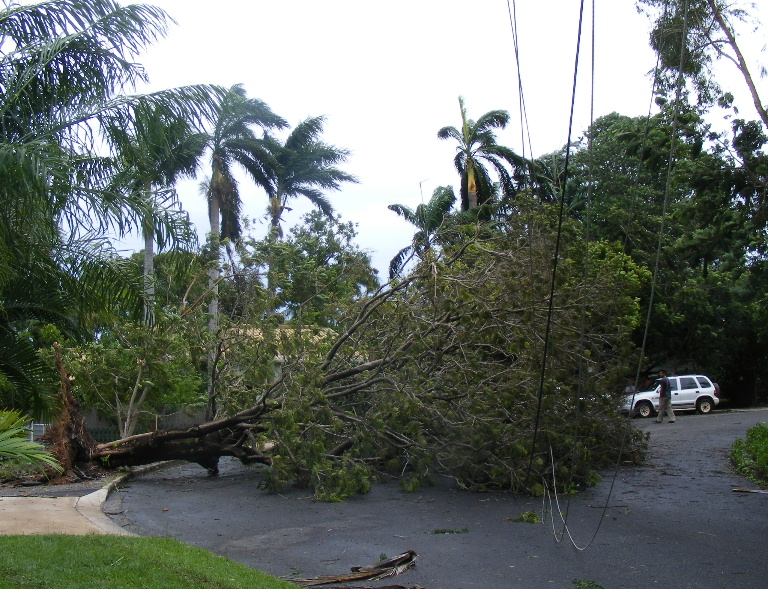
Trees and power lines downed in Darwin as a result of Cyclone Helen

Starting in late December, widespread rains produced by the precursor to Helen prompted the issuance of flood warnings throughout the Top End region. Prior to the arrival of Cyclone Helen on 4 January, the Bureau of Meteorology issued cyclone warnings for areas between the Mitchell Plateau, in Western Australia, to Cape Hotham in the Northern Territory. According to local officials, flooding was the greatest concern from the storm rather than wind damage. The warning area was later condensed to encompass areas from Wadeye to Cape Hotham, including Darwin and the Tiwi Islands. By 6 January, warnings were issued for the western coast of the Cape York Peninsula between Karumba and Weipa as the remnants of Helen were forecast to regain storm intensity.

In light of Helen's approach in the Top End region, the Compass Resources mining company suspended construction of a new mine in Batchelor. Mining at the Ranger Uranium Mine maintained by Energy Resources of Australia was also suspended until the storm passed. The George Brown Darwin Botanic Gardens and Territory Wildlife Park were also closed for the duration of the storm. Residents in the Aboriginal community of Wadeye were strongly advised to take precautions for the storm. Following the issuance of a cyclone warning in Darwin, local shelters were opened to the public. At the Darwin International Airport, all incoming and outgoing flights through Jetstar Airways were cancelled while Tiger Airways rescheduled their flights and no changes were made by Qantas. Darwin Harbour was mostly shut down as seas became too rough to sail in. Schools and day cares within a 50 km (31 mi) radius of the city were closed on 4 January.

== Impact and aftermath ==
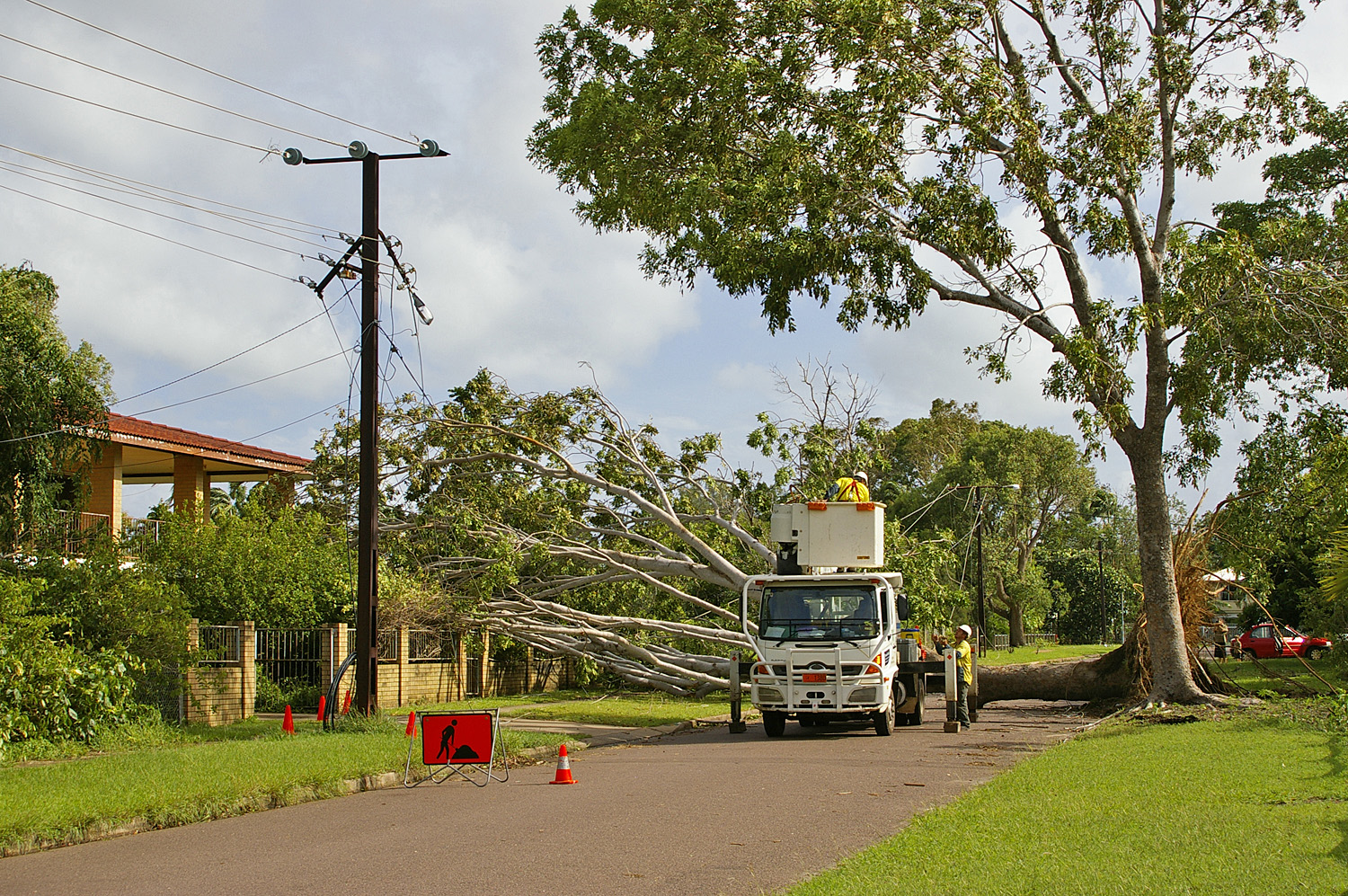
Power crews clearing trees and fixing downed wires in the wake of Cyclone Helen

Throughout the Top End region, the precursor to Helen resulted in a prolonged period of moderate rains over a relatively large area. These rains caused the Victoria River to swell over its banks and flood nearby areas. On 4 January, a car with three people was swept away by the river; two of the passengers managed to escape and swim to shore, but the third person remained trapped. Aerial searches were made later that day for him, though he was later declared dead. After becoming a tropical cyclone, the storm produced additional moderate to heavy rainfall, generally totaling between 100 and 200 mm (3.9 and 7.9 in). Between 1 and 6 January, a total of 174.6 mm (6.87 in) of rain fell in Darwin. These rains affected two additional major rivers in the area: the Adelaide and Katherine rivers. Near where the storm made landfall, wind gusts up to 120 km/h (75 mph) were recorded; Darwin recorded a maximum wind gust of 102 km/h (63 mph) as Helen moved by the city.

Near Channel Point, the cyclone brought a storm surge of 2 to 3 m (6.6 to 9.8 ft), barely surpassing the highest astronomical tide in a few areas. In some cases, waves over topped sand dunes but no damage took place. Roughly 10-15% of trees in open areas were snapped or uprooted by high winds. Only two structures sustained direct wind damage while several others were struck by downed trees. Damage was more widespread in Darwin where roughly 15,000 homes, 60% of the city's residences, were left without power. Approximately 1,500 trees were downed in the city, falling on roads, homes and power lines. In the days following the storm's passage, the Adelaide and Katherine rivers continued to rise, of which the former exceeded minor flood levels. In the harbour, seven vessels washed ashore, each sustaining minor damage. Losses caused by the storm was placed at A$1.3 million (US$1.1 million).

The day after Helen passed through, cleanup efforts began as power crews had to remove downed trees before fixing power lines. The main power lines in the city were restored within 24 hours and rural areas were stated to have their power back within a day or two. Two days after the storm, 500 homes remained without electricity and frustrated residents were further angered after discovering that the Power and Water agency was in control of tree removal and not emergency services. With the power company in charge of clearing downed trees, they stated that their crews would only be dealing with cases involved power lines. Residents with trees in their yards or even on their homes were told to contact private contractors to remove them. By 9 January, more than 100 homes were still without power in northern Darwin, resulting in angry outcries from those still left in the dark. Cleanup efforts dragged on for more than two months as debris was still present in Darwin in March. Removal of tree stumps took through at least mid-April as the cost to remove downed trees exceeded A$1 million (US$882,000). Due to the damage wrought by Helen, its name was retired following its usage. However, it was not replaced by any particular name as a new naming scheme was implemented the following season.

== See also ==
- 2007–08 Australian region cyclone season
- Timeline of the 2007–08 Australian region cyclone season
- Cyclone Gretel – The last storm to bring gale-force winds to Darwin prior to Helen
- Cyclone Carlos – The next cyclone to hit Darwin, bringing record rainfall to the city.
