= Cyclone Carlos =

Category 3 Australian region tropical cyclone in 2011

Severe Tropical Cyclone Carlos
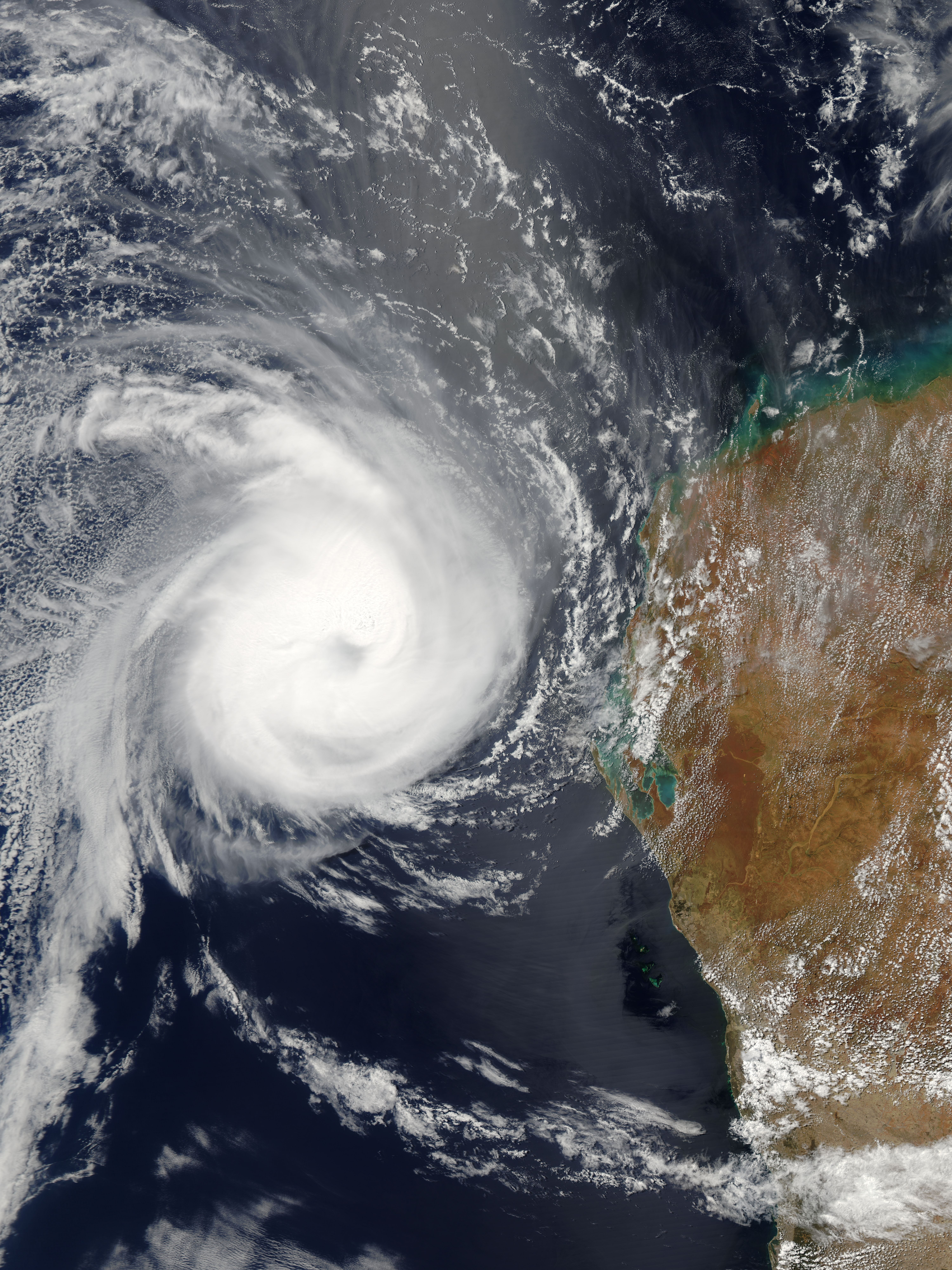
- Cyclone Carlos on 24 February

Meteorological history
- Formed: 14 February 2011
- Dissipated: 27 February 2011

Category 3 severe tropical cyclone
- 10-minute sustained (BOM)
- Highest winds: 120 km/h (75 mph)
- Lowest pressure: 969 hPa (mbar); 28.61 inHg

Category 1-equivalent tropical cyclone
- 1-minute sustained (SSHWS/JTWC)
- Highest winds: 120 km/h (75 mph)

Overall effects
- Fatalities: None
- Damage: $12.3 million (2011 USD)
- Areas affected: Northern Territory, Western Australia
- Part of the 2010–11 Australian region cyclone season

Severe Tropical Cyclone Carlos was a strong tropical cyclone that made landfall in Australia and resulted in $12.3 million USD in damages. Carlos was first spotted on 14 February near Batchelor and intensified to a Category 3 cyclone on 22 February. The storm affected Australia for most of its life.

== Meteorological history ==
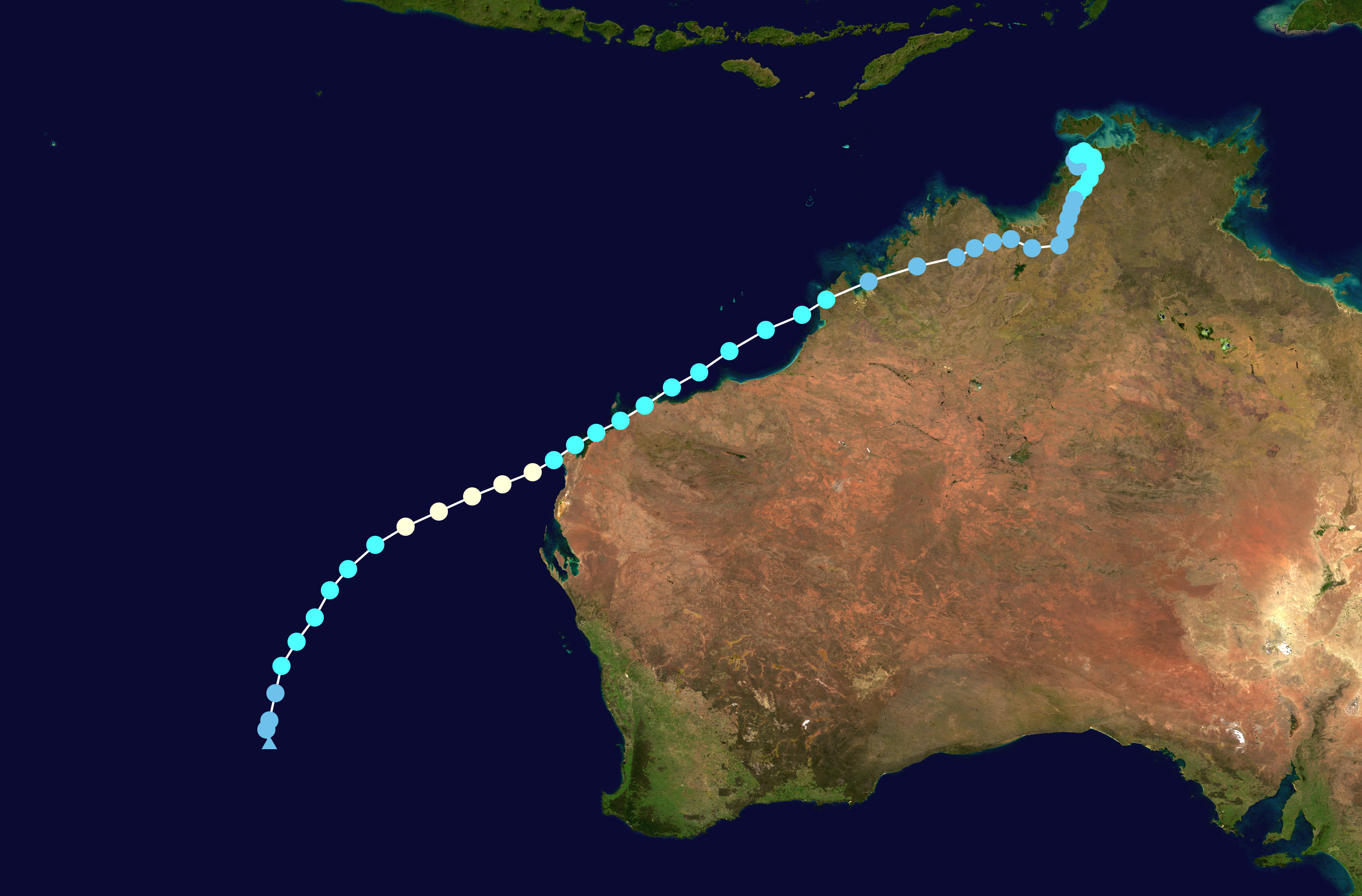
Map plotting the storm's track and intensity, according to the Saffir–Simpson scale Map key Saffir–Simpson scale Tropical depression (≤38 mph, ≤62 km/h) Tropical storm (39–73 mph, 63–118 km/h) Category 1 (74–95 mph, 119–153 km/h) Category 2 (96–110 mph, 154–177 km/h) Category 3 (111–129 mph, 178–208 km/h) Category 4 (130–156 mph, 209–251 km/h) Category 5 (≥157 mph, ≥252 km/h) Unknown Storm type Tropical cyclone Subtropical cyclone Extratropical cyclone, remnant low, tropical disturbance, or monsoon depression

On 14 February, the Tropical Cyclone Warning Centre (TCWC) in Darwin reported that a tropical low formed near latitude 13.2S, longitude 130.7E, about 40 km (25 miles) west southwest of Batchelor. A severe weather warning was issued for northwest Darwin-Daly District and the Tiwi Islands. Heavy rain pounded the area on 15 February with reports of Marrara recording 179.4 mm (7.06 in) and Darwin International Airport 131.0 mm (5.16 in) of rain. This was later followed by 339.6 mm (13.37 in) of rain in just 24 hours, which is the highest 24-hour rainfall for the city on record.

On 16 February, the slow moving system strengthened into After looping around the Darwin area overnight and back over land the system weakened on 17 February and BOM downgraded it to a Tropical low. A record three-day total of 684.8 mm (26.96 in) rain was recorded at Darwin International Airport due to the lingering of the system.

The system moved slowly southwest on 18 February moving towards the Northern Territory/Western Australian border with a possibility of restrengthening. The community of Daly River received 442 mm (17.4 in) of rainfall. On 19 February the system passed into the Northern Kimberley region. Rainfall totals were not as large as in previous days. Wyndham recorded 90 mm (3.5 in) while Kalumburu recorded 80 mm (3.1 in) of rainfall.

In the early hours of 21 February the system returned to the open waters of the Indian Ocean, causing it to redevelop back into a cyclone. The system was located 75 km (47 mi) northwest of Broome. The cyclone continued to track southwest at a relatively fast pace and produced a squall line that generated four tornadoes in the mining town of Karratha. It also strengthened steadily to become a category 2 cyclone.

On 22 February the system moved parallel to the Pilbara coast. Varanus Island recorded 59 mm (2.3 in) of rainfall and the highest wind gust recorded in the area was 120 km/h (75 mph) at Bedout Island. The system became more organised and on 23 February the record rainfall amount of 283 mm (11.1 in) was recorded at Barrow Island. The strongest gusts of 139 km/h (86 mph) recorded at Varanus Island. The cyclone crossed the North West Cape and lashed Onslow and Exmouth with high winds up to 155 km/h (96 mph) and rain.

As Carlos moved away from the western coast of Australia on 24 February it strengthened into a Severe Tropical Cyclone. Carlos also caused a mini tornado to hit Ellenbrook, Perth, Western Australia on 28 February. The system dissipated on February 27.

== Impact ==
Tropical Cyclone Carlos caused localized flooding and damage to homes, with fallen trees, resulting in schools in Darwin being closed, along with Darwin International Airport and East Arm Wharf. The tornadoes the system produced damaged 38 homes as well as numerous cars, buildings and a school. Overall, the system caused about $16 million AUS$ ($12.3 USD).
