= Cyclone Marcus =

Category 5 Australian region cyclone in 2018

Severe Tropical Cyclone Marcus
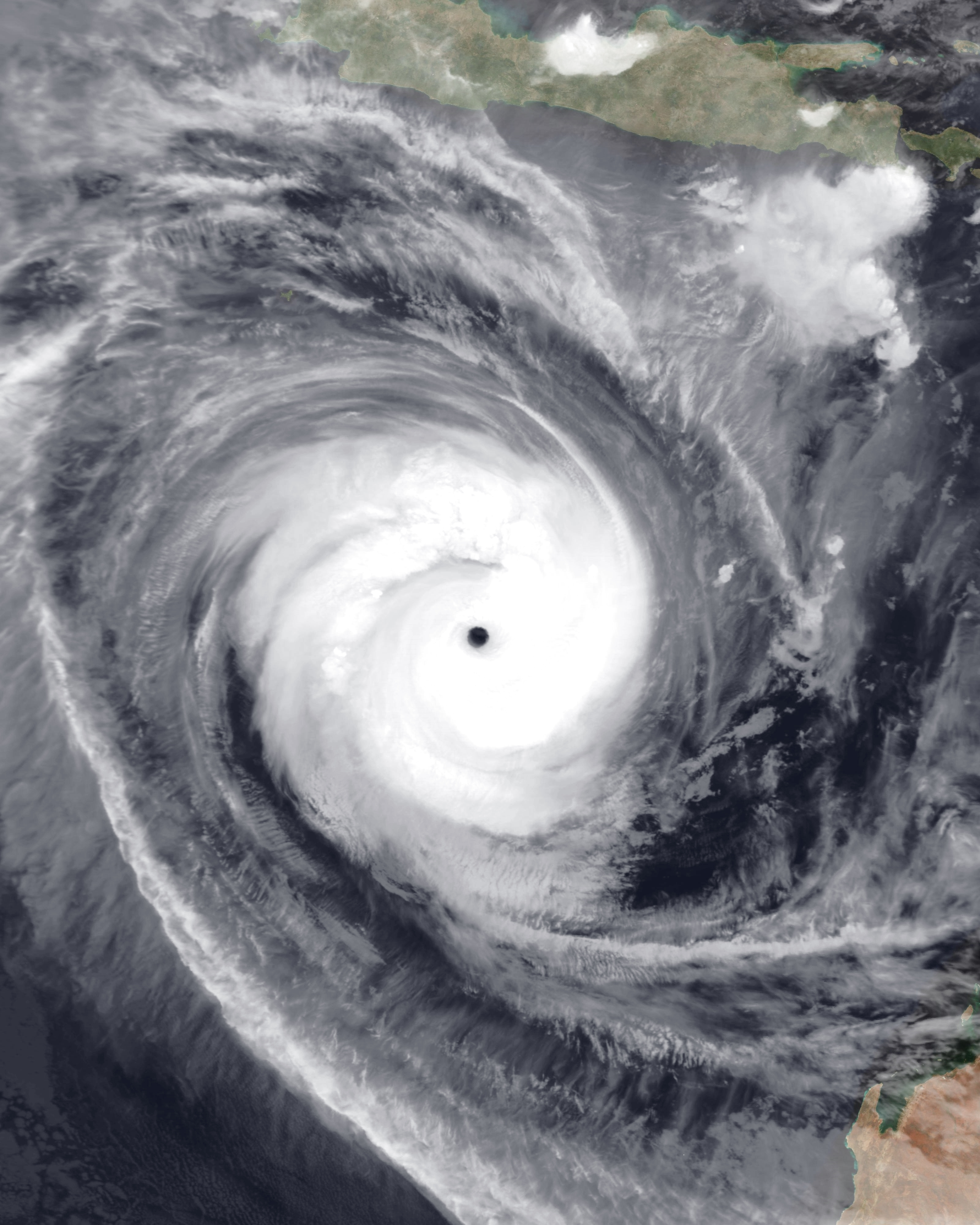
- Marcus at record-peak intensity off the Western Australian coast on 22 March

Meteorological history
- Formed: 14 March 2018
- Post-tropical: 24 March 2018
- Dissipated: 27 March 2018

Category 5 severe tropical cyclone
- 10-minute sustained (Aus)
- Highest winds: 250 km/h (155 mph)
- Highest gusts: 350 km/h (220 mph)
- Lowest pressure: 905 hPa (mbar); 26.72 inHg (Fifth-lowest pressure in Australian basin)

Category 5-equivalent tropical cyclone
- 1-minute sustained (SSHWS/JTWC)
- Highest winds: 280 km/h (175 mph)
- Lowest pressure: 906 hPa (mbar); 26.75 inHg

Overall effects
- Fatalities: None
- Damage: $75 million (2018 USD)
- Areas affected: Northern Territory, Western Australia
- Part of the 2017–18 Australian region cyclone season

Severe Tropical Cyclone Marcus was a very powerful tropical cyclone that struck Australia's Northern Territory and the Kimberley region of Western Australia in March 2018. It was the strongest tropical cyclone of the 2017–18 Australian region cyclone season, the strongest tropical cyclone in the Australian region basin since George in 2007, the fifth most intense cyclone in the Australian basin, and is tied with Cyclone Monica as the strongest cyclone in the Australian Region in terms of 10-minute maximum sustained winds. It was also the strongest tropical cyclone since Tracy to hit Darwin, making landfall there as a Category 2 tropical cyclone. Marcus formed on March 14 from a tropical low situated over the northeast Timor Sea, which quickly moved southeast and strengthened into a tropical cyclone the next day.

== Meteorological history ==
Map plotting the storm's track and intensity, according to the Saffir–Simpson scale Map key Saffir–Simpson scale Tropical depression (≤38 mph, ≤62 km/h) Tropical storm (39–73 mph, 63–118 km/h) Category 1 (74–95 mph, 119–153 km/h) Category 2 (96–110 mph, 154–177 km/h) Category 3 (111–129 mph, 178–208 km/h) Category 4 (130–156 mph, 209–251 km/h) Category 5 (≥157 mph, ≥252 km/h) Unknown Storm type Tropical cyclone Subtropical cyclone Extratropical cyclone, remnant low, tropical disturbance, or monsoon depression

On 15 March 2018, a tropical low formed in the western Arafura Sea. Drifting east-southeastwards north of the Tiwi Islands, the tropical low strengthened into a Category 1 tropical cyclone on the Australian scale early on 16 March, and was accordingly given the name Marcus. In a generally favourable environment for intensification, Cyclone Marcus reached Category 2 status in the hours before it crossed the Northern Territory coastline, on 17 March. On 16 March, Marcus moved down towards the Australian coast, and rapidly intensified before making landfall in Darwin as a weak Category 2 tropical cyclone.

Marcus intensified markedly upon moving away from the coast. Soon, the storm started to rapidly intensify, and by 21 March, Marcus reached Category 5 tropical cyclone intensity. However, after doing so, the storm began to rapidly weaken due to a combination of an eyewall replacement cycle, stronger wind shear, and cooler waters. Marcus continued to rapidly weaken as it moved southward. The system soon became post-tropical on March 25, though Marcus' remnant would continue moving southeastward for another couple of days. On March 27, the remnant low of Marcus dissipated off the southwest coast of Australia.

== Preparation and impact ==
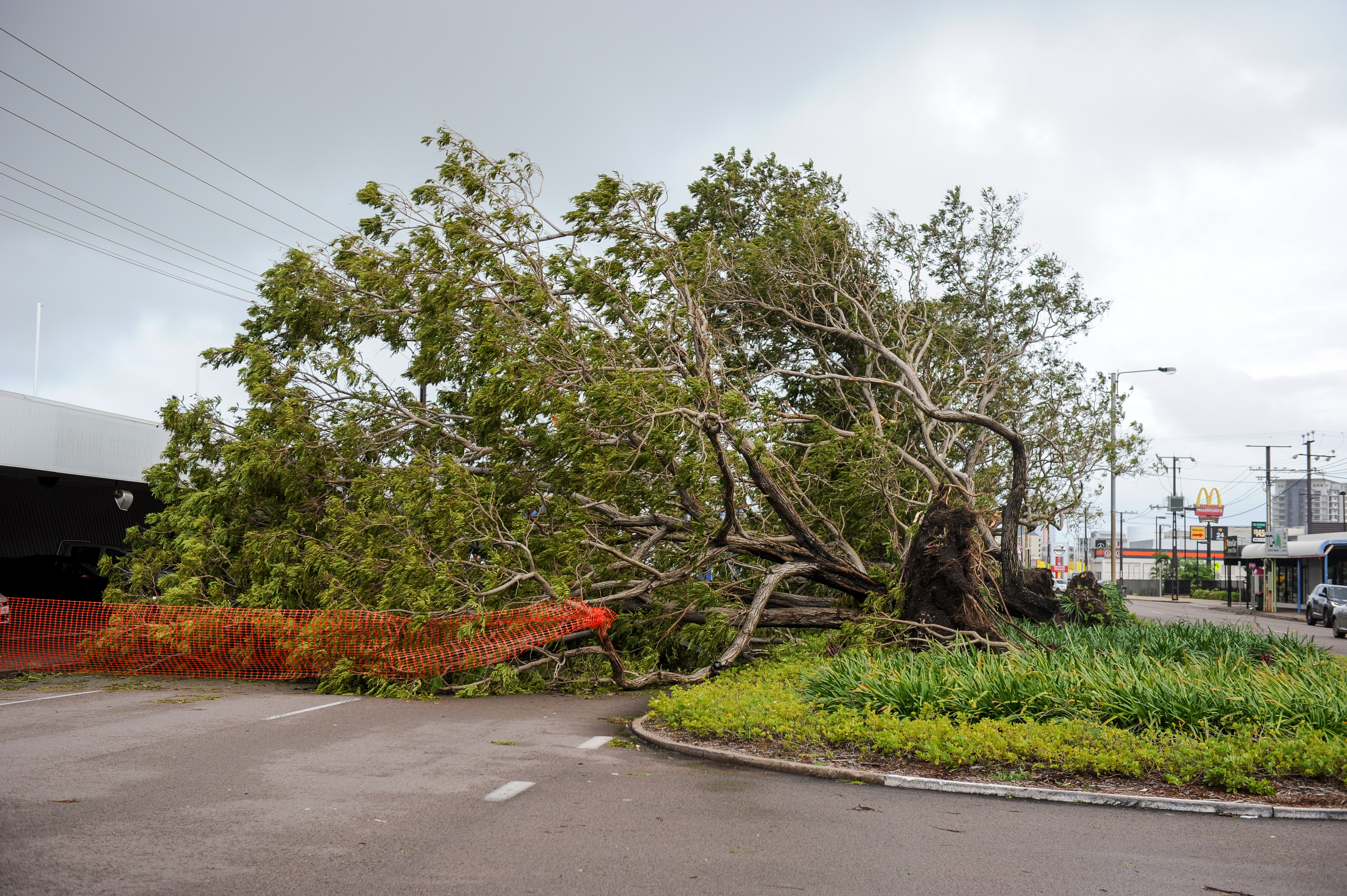
A large tree blocks the Stuart Highway in Darwin about three hours after the cyclone passed Darwin.

Before the storm, on 15 March, the Australian Bureau of Meteorology (BoM) issued cyclone warnings for Darwin, the Tiwi Islands, and parts of the northwest Top End. Major events and flights in and out of Darwin were cancelled. Approximately 26,000 homes were affected by electricity outages as a result of the destructive winds, even in areas as far south as Batchelor and Adelaide River. Thousands of trees were destroyed across the Greater Darwin region including many African mahoganies planted after Cyclone Tracy for their fast growing and expansive shade qualities.

Most intense Australian cyclones
Rank	Cyclone	Year	Min. pressure
1	Gwenda	1999	900 hPa (26.58 inHg)
1	Inigo	2003	900 hPa (26.58 inHg)
3	George	2007	902 hPa (26.64 inHg)
4	Orson	1989	904 hPa (26.70 inHg)
5	Marcus	2018	905 hPa (26.72 inHg)
6	Theodore	1994	910 hPa (26.87 inHg)
6	Vance	1999	910 hPa (26.87 inHg)
6	Fay	2004	910 hPa (26.87 inHg)
6	Glenda	2006	910 hPa (26.87 inHg)
10	Mahina	1899	914 hPa (26.99 inHg) (Note: Currently, the World Meteorological Organization recognises the lowest pressure of Cyclone Mahina as 27 inches of mercury (914 hPa) based on an observation from the time. A 2014 reconstruction project of Cyclone Mahina by the American Meteorological Society concluded that the 13 metre storm surge produced by the cyclone likely produced barometric pressure levels as low as 880 hPa, which would place it as the strongest tropical cyclone in the Southern Hemisphere, but the metric is not yet approved by the WMO.)
Source: Australian Bureau of Meteorology

Public schools and non-essential public service agencies were closed while the clean-up efforts continued and tree trunks removed from roads. Cyclone Marcus was the most destructive storm to hit Darwin since Cyclone Tracy caused devastation on Christmas Eve of 1974. The insurance loss were over A$85 million (US$65.6 million). In all, Marcus caused an estimated total of A$97.46 million (US$75 million) in damages.

The Palmerston City Council election, scheduled for 17 March, was postponed by a week until 24 March because of Marcus.

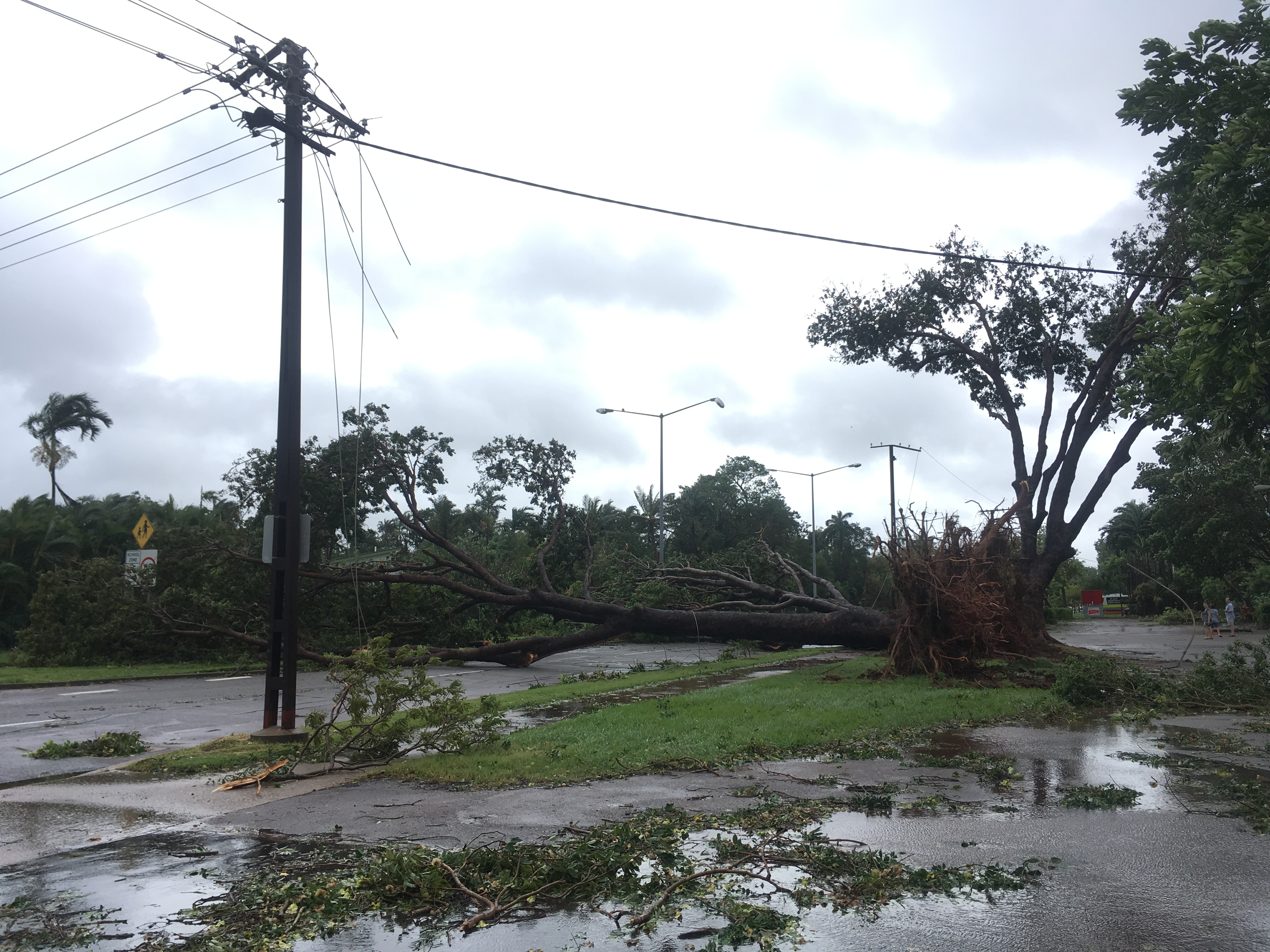
Fallen trees and power lines after Marcus in Parap

The cleanup response was coordinated by the Northern Territory Emergency Services and included soldiers from the 5th Battalion and the 1st Combat Engineer Regiment of the Australian Army. The US Marine Rotational Force – Darwin (MRF-D) also contributed to the cleanup effort.

== Retirement ==
Due to the damage caused by the cyclone in Darwin and its subsequent intensification, the name Marcus was retired and was replaced with Marco.

== See also ==
- Weather of 2017 and 2018
- Tropical cyclones in 2017 and 2018
- 1897 Darwin cyclone – a cyclone that also caused severe damage in Darwin
- Cyclone Fina (2025) – the next cyclone to directly impact Darwin
- Similarly intense tropical cyclones in the Australian Region:
  - Cyclone Inigo (2003)
  - Cyclone Gwenda (1999)
  - Cyclone Orson (1989)
