= Cyclone Gwenda =

Category 5 Australian region cyclone in 1999

Severe Tropical Cyclone Gwenda
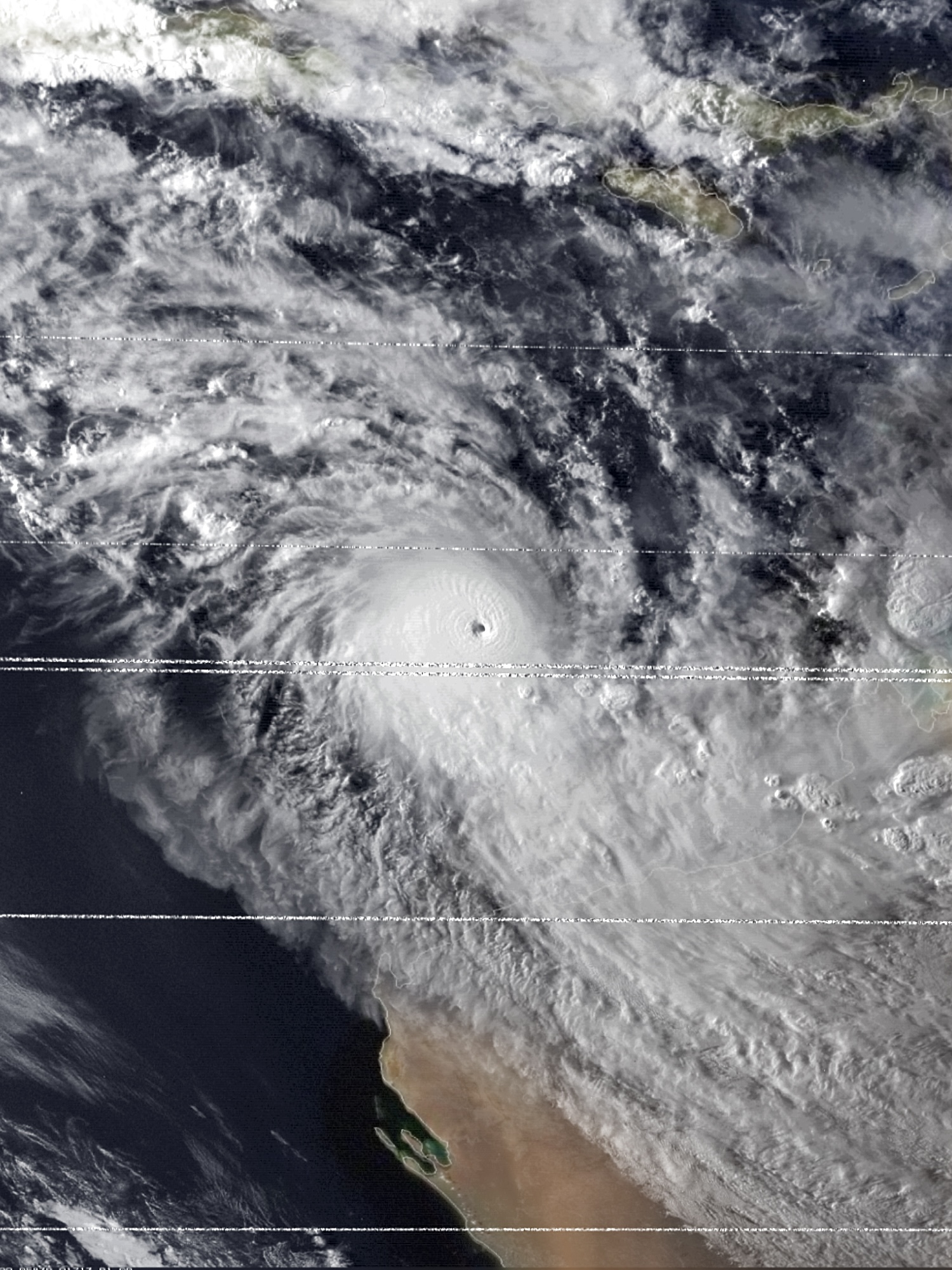
- Cyclone Gwenda near its record-tying peak intensity on April 6

Meteorological history
- Formed: 2 April 1999
- Dissipated: 8 April 1999

Category 5 severe tropical cyclone
- 10-minute sustained (BOM)
- Highest winds: 220 km/h (140 mph)
- Lowest pressure: 900 hPa (mbar); 26.58 inHg (Record low in Australian region; tied with Inigo)

Category 4-equivalent tropical cyclone
- 1-minute sustained (SSHWS/JTWC)
- Highest winds: 240 km/h (150 mph)
- Lowest pressure: 910 hPa (mbar); 26.87 inHg

Overall effects
- Fatalities: None
- Damage: Minimal
- Areas affected: Western Australia
- IBTrACS
- Part of the 1998–99 Australian region cyclone season

Severe Tropical Cyclone Gwenda is tied with Cyclone Inigo as the most intense Australian tropical cyclone on record (with the possible exception of Cyclone Mahina), with a barometric pressure of 900 hPa (mbar) and was the most intense storm worldwide in 1999. Forming out of a tropical disturbance over the Arafura Sea on 2 April 1999, the precursor to Gwenda tracked slowly westward and gradually became more organised. On 4 April, the system developed into a Category 1 cyclone and was named Gwenda. It began to undergo explosive intensification the following day, and in a 30-hour span ending early on 7 April, the storm's maximum 10-minute sustained wind speed increased from 75 to 225 km/h (45 to 140 mph) and its barometric pressure decreased to 900 hPa (mbar). The Joint Typhoon Warning Center reported that the storm had peaked as a high-end Category 4 equivalent on the Saffir–Simpson hurricane scale.

Increasing wind shear and an acceleration in forward speed caused Gwenda to quickly weaken. Less than 18 hours after peaking, the storm made landfall roughly 45 km (28 mi) east of Port Hedland, Western Australia with winds of 100 km/h (60 mph). After moving ashore, Gwenda abruptly stalled before dissipating on 8 April. Although it was once an extremely intense cyclone, the factors that caused its deterioration also prevented significant damage. Rainfall from the storm peaked at 205 mm (8.1 in). Minor structural damage was reported, and only localised flooding was recorded. Following its usage, the name Gwenda was retired at the end of the season.

== Meteorological history ==
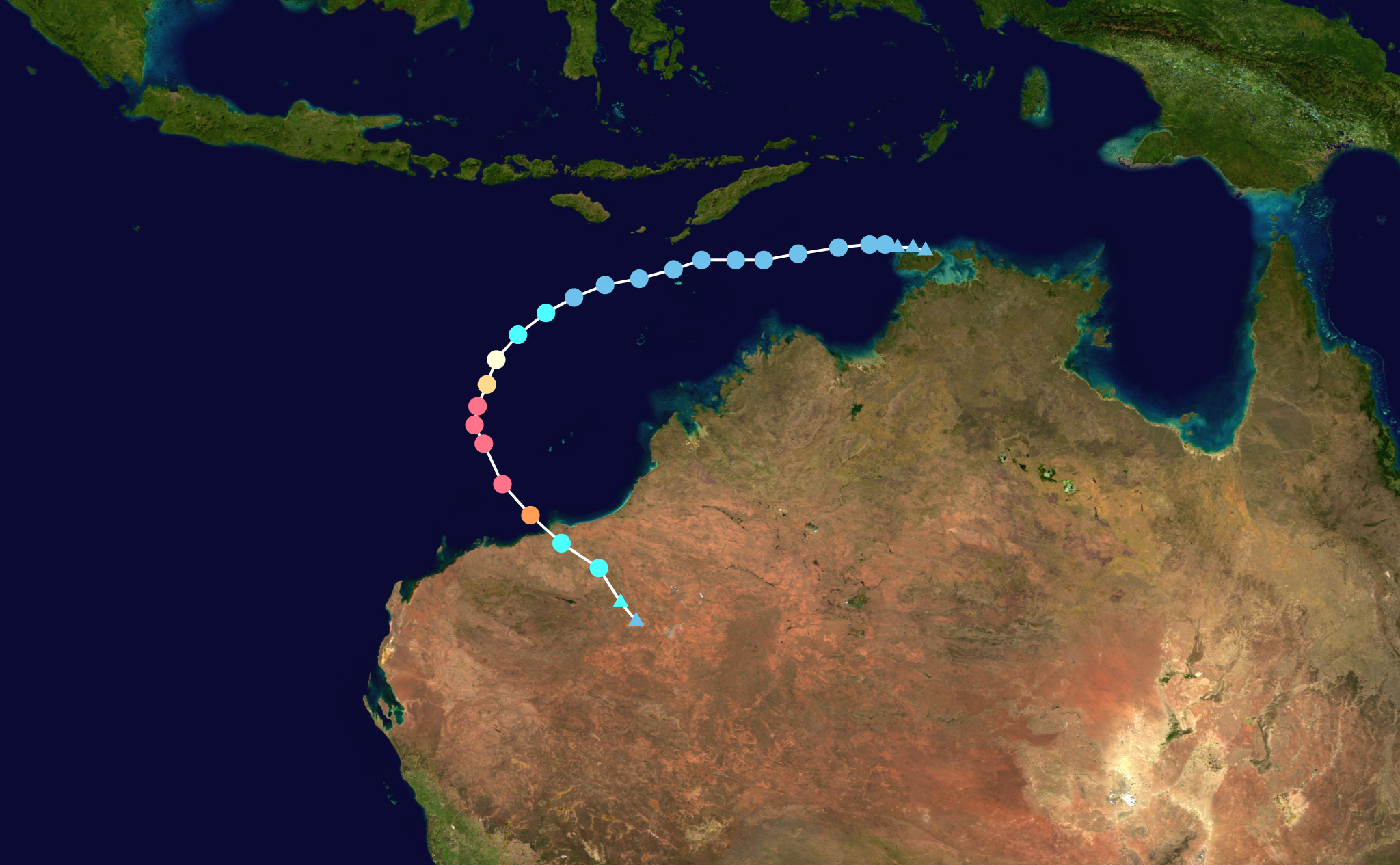
Map plotting the storm's track and intensity, according to the Saffir–Simpson scale Map key Saffir–Simpson scale Tropical depression (≤38 mph, ≤62 km/h) Tropical storm (39–73 mph, 63–118 km/h) Category 1 (74–95 mph, 119–153 km/h) Category 2 (96–110 mph, 154–177 km/h) Category 3 (111–129 mph, 178–208 km/h) Category 4 (130–156 mph, 209–251 km/h) Category 5 (≥157 mph, ≥252 km/h) Unknown Storm type Tropical cyclone Subtropical cyclone Extratropical cyclone, remnant low, tropical disturbance, or monsoon depression

Severe Tropical Cyclone Gwenda originated from a weak tropical disturbance that formed on 1 April over the Arafura Sea. Drifting westward, the system gradually became better organised, and early on 2 April, the Australian Bureau of Meteorology classified it as a tropical low. Over the following two days, the low continued to mature; on 4 April, the Bureau of Meteorology upgraded it to a Category 1 cyclone and named it Gwenda. Around the same time, the Joint Typhoon Warning Center (JTWC) issued a Tropical Cyclone Formation Alert as deep convection became concentrated around the centre of circulation and the system's outflow significantly improved. Located within an environment of low to moderate wind shear, the storm was expected to intensify.

By 5 April, the JTWC began issuing advisories on Gwenda, classifying it as a weak tropical storm and designating it as Cyclone 32S. Tracking southwest in response to a subtropical ridge to the south, Gwenda began to rapidly intensify. Its forward motion significantly decreased as it turned due south before curving towards the southeast, and in a 30-hour span, maximum winds around the centre of the storm increased from 75 to 225 km/h (45 to 140 mph). The barometric pressure decreased by 90 hPa (mbar), making Gwenda one of the fastest intensifying storms on record. At the end of the intensification phase on 7 April, the Bureau of Meteorology classified the storm as a Category 5 cyclone, the third of the season, with a pressure of 900 hPa (mbar). The JTWC also reported a substantial increase in intensity, classifying Gwenda as a high-end Category 4 equivalent on the Saffir–Simpson hurricane scale with 1-minute sustained winds of 240 km/h (150 mph).

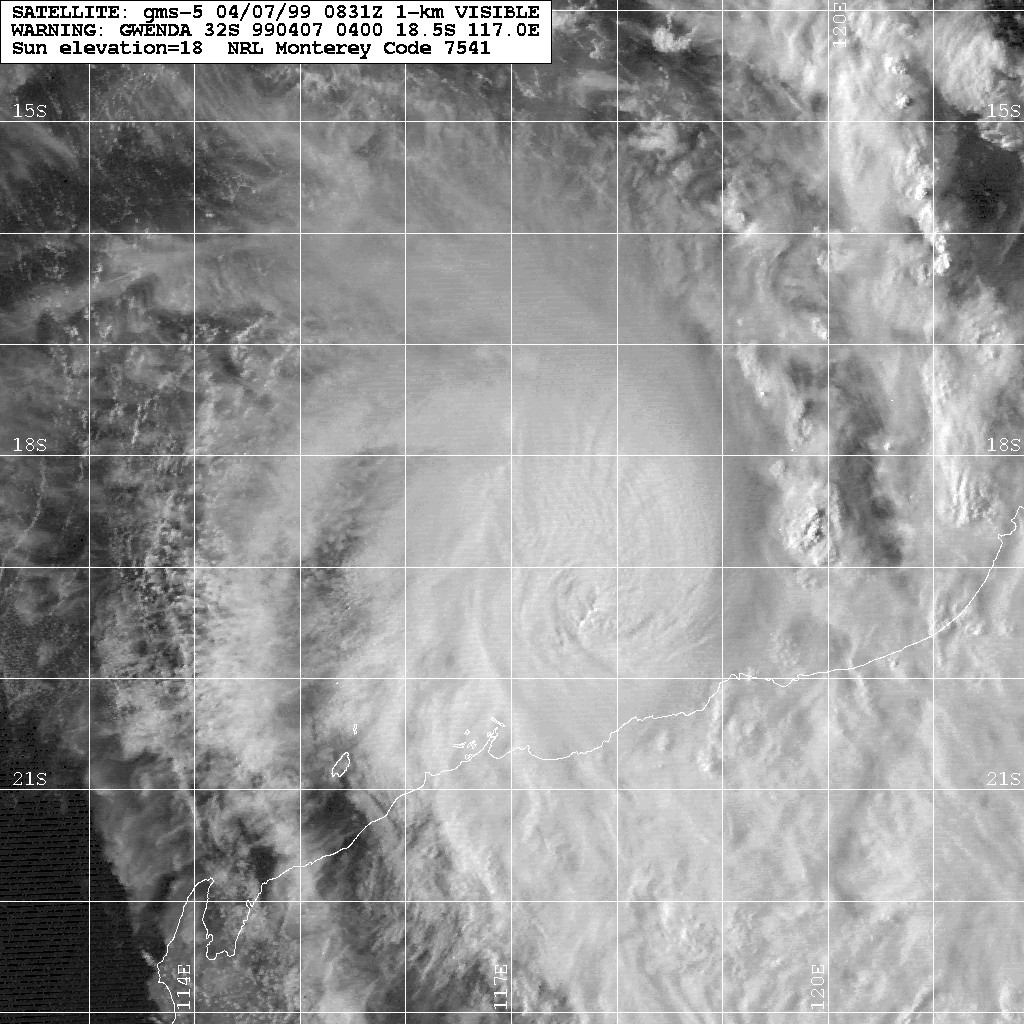
Cyclone Gwenda near landfall on 7 April

Upon attaining peak intensity, Gwenda displayed a well-defined 30 km (19 mi) eye surrounded by deep convection. At this time, some monitoring satellites estimated that it had attained winds of 260 km/h (160 mph), equivalent to a Category 5 hurricane. While Gwenda was active, the Bureau of Meteorology stated that its intensity peaked with winds of 215 km/h (135 mph) and a pressure of 915 hPa (mbar). Hours after attaining this intensity, increasing wind shear began to impact the cyclone, causing convection to become elongated and the eye less defined. Rapid weakening commenced as Gwenda turned southeastward towards the Pilbara coastline.

The cyclone continued to deteriorate as it approached Western Australia, with convection displaced ahead of its centre. In addition to the wind shear, Gwenda's forward speed suddenly increased, leading to further disorganisation. Late on 7 April, the centre of Gwenda made landfall as a Category 2 cyclone roughly 45 km (28 mi) east of Port Hedland with winds of 100 km/h (60 mph). The JTWC estimated the storm to have been slightly stronger at landfall, with winds near 120 km/h (75 mph). Shortly after moving inland, the JTWC issued their final advisory on the weakening storm. The Bureau of Meteorology continued to monitor Gwenda as it abruptly stalled just onshore. However, convection associated with Gwenda continued to stream southeastward due to high wind shear. The storm's remnants persisted for several hours before dissipating early on 8 April.

The Australian Bureau of Meteorology uses 10-minute sustained winds, while the Joint Typhoon Warning Center uses one-minute sustained winds. The Bureau of Meteorology's peak intensity for Gwenda was 225 km/h (140 mph) 10-minute sustained, or 260 km/h (160 mph) one-minute sustained. The JTWC's peak intensity for Gwenda was 240 km/h (150 mph) one-minute sustained, or 220 km/h (135 mph) 10-minute sustained.

== Preparations, impact and records ==
Most intense Australian cyclones
Rank	Cyclone	Year	Min. pressure
1	Gwenda	1999	900 hPa (26.58 inHg)
1	Inigo	2003	900 hPa (26.58 inHg)
3	George	2007	902 hPa (26.64 inHg)
4	Orson	1989	904 hPa (26.70 inHg)
5	Marcus	2018	905 hPa (26.72 inHg)
6	Theodore	1994	910 hPa (26.87 inHg)
6	Vance	1999	910 hPa (26.87 inHg)
6	Fay	2004	910 hPa (26.87 inHg)
6	Glenda	2006	910 hPa (26.87 inHg)
10	Mahina	1899	914 hPa (26.99 inHg) (Note: Currently, the World Meteorological Organization recognises the lowest pressure of Cyclone Mahina as 27 inches of mercury (914 hPa) based on an observation from the time. A 2014 reconstruction project of Cyclone Mahina by the American Meteorological Society concluded that the 13 metre storm surge produced by the cyclone likely produced barometric pressure levels as low as 880 hPa, which would place it as the strongest tropical cyclone in the Southern Hemisphere, but the metric is not yet approved by the WMO.)
Source: Australian Bureau of Meteorology

Already suffering from the effects of Cyclone Vance two weeks earlier, which had destroyed or severely damaged 40% of the homes in Exmouth, residents in Western Australia heeded warnings of the impending cyclone. By 6 April, the Bureau of Meteorology had issued storm warnings for areas between Port Hedland and Exmouth. State Emergency Services throughout the threatened areas were put on high alert. Several offshore oil platforms were shut down and evacuated on 6 April and did not reopen until 15 April. Hours before the storm made landfall, the State Emergency Services stated that "Gwenda potentially had the destructive power of Cyclone Vance", and urged residents to seek appropriate shelter. Shortly before the storm struck, Len Broadbridge, director of the Western Australia Bureau of Meteorology declared, "Port Hedland is now in grave danger."

Despite the cyclone's strength, its effects were relatively minor. Winds up to 100 km/h (62 mph) were recorded in Port Hedland, leading to minor structural damage. The police in Port Hedland reported severe damage to one house, but no deaths or injuries. Emergency crews were sent to the northwest coast of Australia to assist in cleaning up damages, but found no "major incidents" or significant damage as a result of the storm. A group of five people on a camping trip in the Outback were stranded by the storm, when heavy rains swept away their vehicle. The group "would have perished", but one of its members hiked non-stop for twenty four hours to a manganese mine where he contacted rescuers.

In a 12-hour span, Port Hedland recorded 86 mm (3.4 in) of rain, well-above the average April precipitation total of 23 mm (0.91 in). Towns in the Pilbara region of Australia received heavy rainfall, amounting to 130 mm (5.1 in) in some places. Carlindi picked up the greatest rainfall total of 205 mm (8.1 in). This rain caused localised flooding, especially in Nullagine where the river traversing the town broke its banks. The rainfall contributed to a long-term cooling effect in northern Western Australia, leading to below-average temperatures for much of April.

At its peak Gwenda was the strongest storm on record to form near Australia, surpassing Cyclone Orson in 1989. Gwenda held this record until 2003, when its maximum winds were eclipsed by Cyclone Inigo. Despite the minimal damage, the name was retired from the circulating lists of tropical cyclone names for the Australian Region and was replaced with Gabrielle.

== See also ==
- Cyclone Mahina – The most intense tropical cyclone recorded in the Southern Hemisphere
- Cyclone Monica – Had the strongest maximum wind speeds ever recorded in the Australian basin
- Cyclone Inigo
- Cyclone Lua
