= Cyclone George =

Category 5 Australian region cyclone in 2007

Severe Tropical Cyclone George
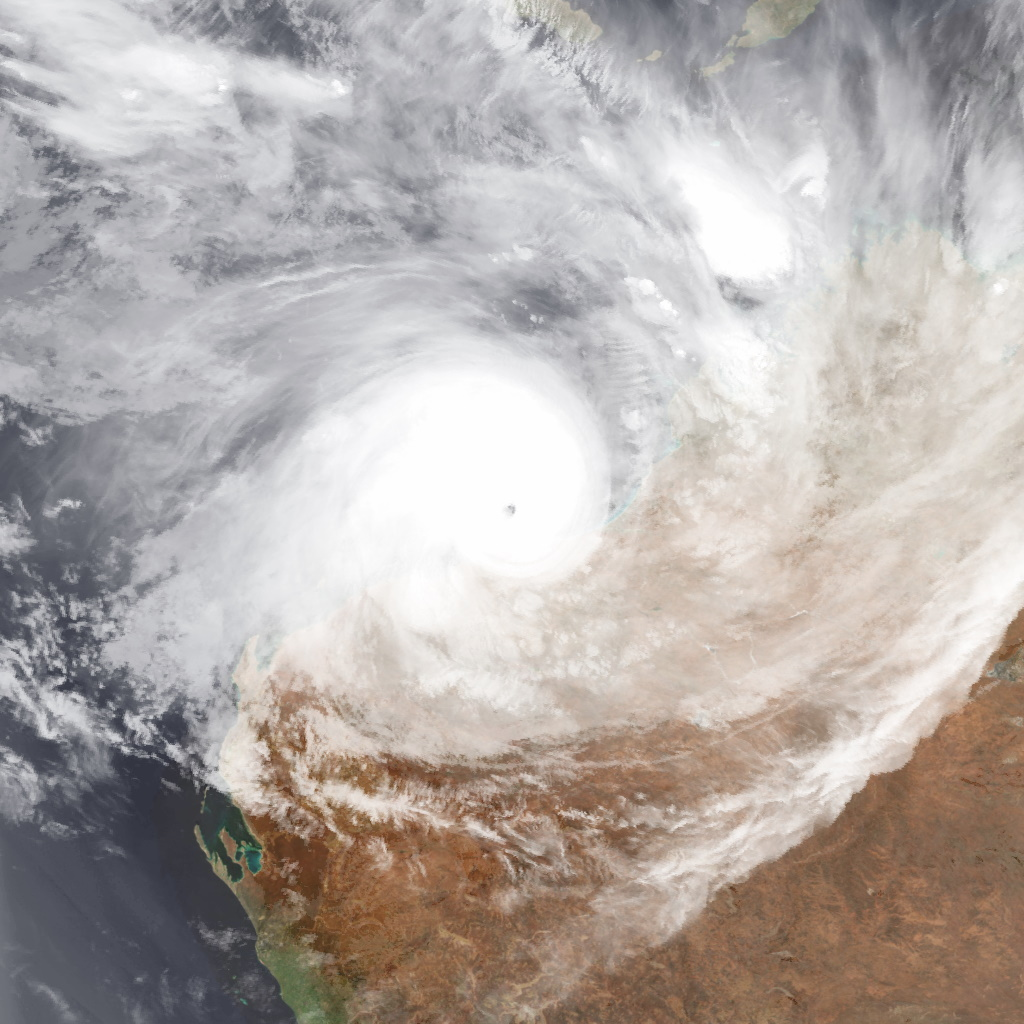
- Cyclone George making landfall on Western Australia at its peak intensity on 8 March

Meteorological history
- Formed: 26 February 2007
- Remnant low: 10 March 2007
- Dissipated: 13 March 2007

Category 5 severe tropical cyclone
- 10-minute sustained (BOM)
- Highest winds: 205 km/h (125 mph)
- Lowest pressure: 902 hPa (mbar); 26.64 inHg (Third-lowest in Australian basin)

Category 3-equivalent tropical cyclone
- 1-minute sustained (SSHWS/JTWC)
- Highest winds: 205 km/h (125 mph)
- Lowest pressure: 941 hPa (mbar); 27.79 inHg

Overall effects
- Fatalities: 5
- Damage: $15.7 million
- Areas affected: Northern Territory, Western Australia
- IBTrACS
- Part of the 2006–07 Australian region cyclone season

Severe Tropical Cyclone George was one of the most powerful Australian tropical cyclones on record, attaining a minimum barometric pressure of 902 mbar (hPa; 26.64 inHg). It was also the strongest tropical cyclone worldwide in 2007 and the last Australian region tropical cyclone to achieve this record to date. The cyclone formed on 26 February 2007 in the Northern Territory's Top End, and intensified when it entered the Joseph Bonaparte Gulf, before crossing the northern coast of the Kimberley. It moved over the Indian Ocean, intensifying to a Category 4 cyclone, and eventually crossed the Pilbara coast just east of Port Hedland at peak intensity. After further analysis from the Bureau of Meteorology, George was reclassified to Category 5. The cyclone caused significant damage to the town of Port Hedland and numerous isolated mining camps around the town. Losses in the Northern Territory amounted to at least A$12 million. Two people died and more than a dozen others were infected in a melioidosis outbreak following the Northern Territory floods. Insured damage in Western Australia amounted to $8 million, and there were three fatalities.

== Meteorological history ==
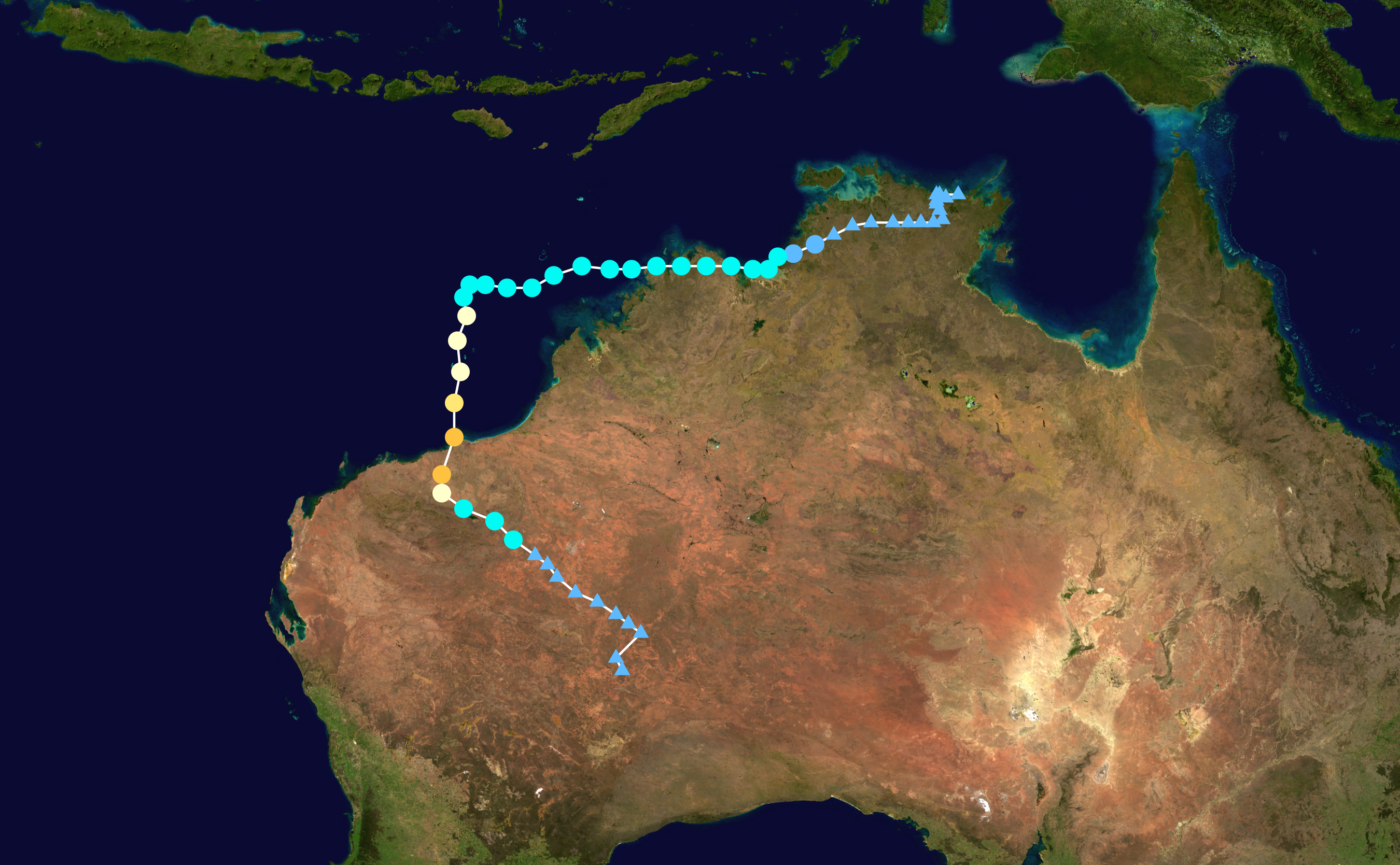
Map plotting the storm's track and intensity, according to the Saffir–Simpson scale Map key Saffir–Simpson scale Tropical depression (≤38 mph, ≤62 km/h) Tropical storm (39–73 mph, 63–118 km/h) Category 1 (74–95 mph, 119–153 km/h) Category 2 (96–110 mph, 154–177 km/h) Category 3 (111–129 mph, 178–208 km/h) Category 4 (130–156 mph, 209–251 km/h) Category 5 (≥157 mph, ≥252 km/h) Unknown Storm type Tropical cyclone Subtropical cyclone Extratropical cyclone, remnant low, tropical disturbance, or monsoon depression

On 24 February 2007, an area of low pressure began consolidating over the Arafura Sea. By 26 February, the Bureau of Meteorology (BOM) warning centre in Darwin classified the system as a tropical low with its centre situated 230 km (140 mi) northwest of Nhulunbuy. Over the following days, the system meandered around the Top End region and showed signs of gradual organisation. Initial forecasts depicted the low as moving gradually eastward and becoming a significant cyclone over the Gulf of Carpentaria; however, after approaching Milingimbi Island on 1 March, the system doubled back to the west in response to a subtropical ridge over central Australia. Though overland, the cyclone remained well-organized (a typical occurrence for tropical lows over Top End). Deep convection blossomed on 2 March, as the system approached the Joseph Bonaparte Gulf. Owing to favourable upper-level outflow and decreasing wind shear, the Joint Typhoon Warning Center (JTWC) issued a Tropical Cyclone Formation Alert for the system that day. The agency estimated the formation of a tropical depression, assigning it the identifier 17S, by 00:00 UTC (9:30 a.m. ACST) on 3 March while it was still over land. Hours later, the low emerged over the Gulf and acquired gale-force winds while situated 75 km (47 mi) south-southeast of Gunbalanya. In light of this, the Darwin warning centre initiated advisories on Tropical Cyclone George, marking the first time since Cyclone Fay, in 2004, that the Darwin office named a storm.

George quickly intensified once offshore, with a very small banding eye of approximately 8 km (5.0 mi) in diameter appearing on SSMI satellite imagery, and gained winds of 95 km/h (60 mph) by 18:00 UTC (3:00 a.m. AWST on 4 March). The system subsequently made landfall in the Kimberley region of Western Australia at that intensity hours later. Substantial structural degradation took place over land, with the eye feature dissipating, and the BOM estimated the system to have briefly weakened to a tropical low before emerging over the extreme eastern Indian Ocean late on 4 March. Once offshore, George regained tropical cyclone strength as it moved steadily west away from Australia. Intensification was slow due to a lack of outflow and increased wind shear. Over the following few days, most forecast models indicated that George would gradually turn to the south as it rounded the subtropical ridge and possibly strike areas between Exmouth and Onslow by 9 March. The models continued to indicate this scenario through 6 March, resulting in a high-confidence forecast from the Perth warning centre.

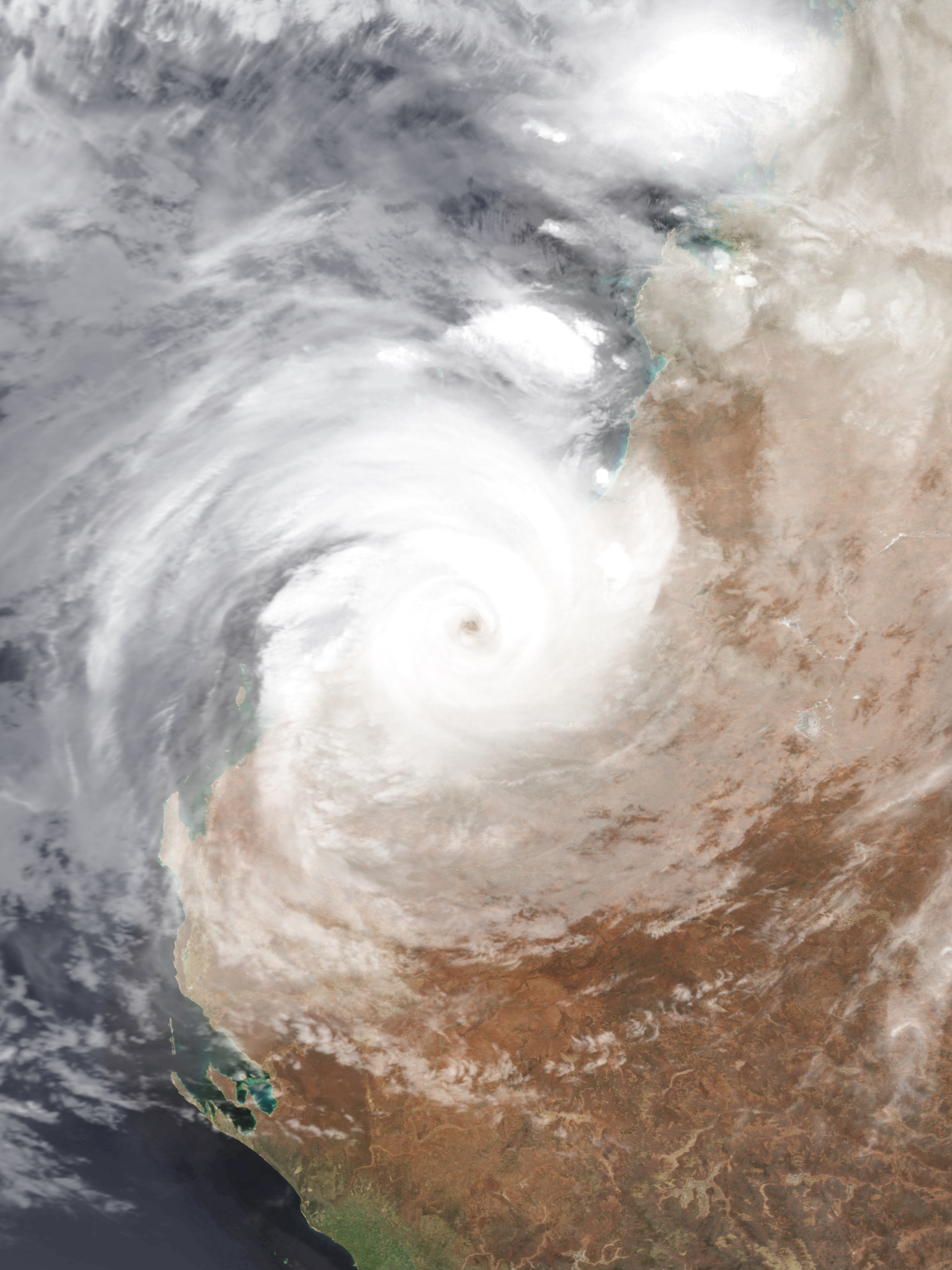
Cyclone George at landfall on 8 March, 2007

However, on 7 March George took an abrupt, nearly 90 degree left turn through a weakness in the ridge and began moving almost due south. This turn caught meteorologists almost entirely off-guard, with only the United Kingdom Met Office ensemble model depicting this scenario. Post-storm reviews of the forecasting failure pointed toward four factors that may have influenced George at the time but were not initialised by the models: the extratropical transition of Cyclone Humba well upstream over the Indian Ocean, a Fujiwhara interaction with Cyclone Jacob to the northwest, the Beta drift effect, and poorly represented monsoonal flow. Of these factors, the monsoonal flow was determined to have been the main cause in the poor track forecast as models did not capture the degree of influence of these winds on the cyclone. This resulted in the forecast track for George having the greatest error of any cyclone in the Western Australian region in at least five years. The average error of 477 km (296 mi) at 48 hours was comparable to the average accuracy of forecasts in the 1980s.

Coinciding with George's turn south was a notable improvement of environmental factors. Wind shear, previously inhibiting organisation, began to decrease while a nearby upper-level low enhanced the system's outflow. The favourable condition allowed for an increase in both strength and size, with both the BOM and JTWC estimating the cyclone to have attained hurricane-force winds (Note: Hurricane-force winds are equivalent to 119 km/h (74 mph) or greater.) by 12:00 UTC (8:00 pm. AWST) on 7 March. By early on 8 March, George featured an area of gale-force winds spanning nearly 400 km (250 mi) across, significantly larger than average. A large cloud-filled eye soon developed before a sudden period of rapid intensification ensued. During this phase, the cyclone's eye steadily contracted to a minimum diameter of roughly 22 km (14 mi). Between 09:00 and 10:00 UTC (5:00–6:00 pm. AWST) on 8 March, George passed directly over Bedout Island. As the eyewall moved over the island, a record-breaking ten-minute sustained wind speed of 194 km/h (121 mph) was measured, until it was surpassed by Cyclone Ilsa in 2023. Based on the extreme winds measured on Bedout and additional intensification thereafter, George was estimated to have reached its peak intensity at 12:00 UTC (8:00 pm. AWST) with winds of 205 km/h (125 mph) and an estimated barometric pressure of 902 mbar (hPa; 26.64 inHg). Automated Dvorak classifications from the Cooperative Institute for Meteorological Satellite Studies at University of Wisconsin–Madison peaked at 6.8, equivalent to a high-end Category 4 on the Saffir–Simpson hurricane wind scale, as the storm moved ashore.

At 10 p.m on 8 March, Cyclone George made landfall 50 kilometres (31 mi) north-east of Port Hedland. When it made landfall, it was still at its peak intensity. Damaging wind gusts of 154 kilometres per hour (96 mph) were recorded at Port Hedland Airport weather station just before 11 pm. The anemometer failed shortly afterwards. At 00:12 on 9 March, an air pressure reading of 962.7 hectopascals (28.43 inHg) was recorded at Port Hedland Airport; this was lowest recorded at the airport during the passage of the cyclone. George weakened slowly while over land and it was downgraded to a Category 3 late on 9 March. The next day, the Tropical Cyclone Warning Centre in Perth issued its final warning for the system. George's remnants continued drifting southeastward and then southward over the next 3 days, before dissipating on 13 March, in southern Australia.

== Preparations ==
Cyclone George resulted in numerous schools and ports in Port Hedland being closed down to deal with the severe cyclone. Mining and Oil & Gas companies had to ultimately close to also deal with the threat of the imminent cyclone. People were additionally evacuated from low lying levels near the sea, and moved either to higher ground, or further inland to Cyclone Shelters.

== Impact ==
=== Northern Territory ===
Effects from the precursor low to George in the Northern Territory

As a developing tropical low, George produced prolonged heavy, in some cases record-breaking, rain across much of the Northern Territory in late February through early March. The most prolific rains took place as the system strengthened and began moving away from the region. In a five-day span, numerous areas saw more than a month's worth of precipitation. Several towns and cities saw single-day rainfall records for March shattered by the system most notably Jabiru Airport with 393.4 mm (15.49 in) falling on 1 March, more than three times the previous highest. Other places that broke daily records include Adelaide River, Black Point, Channel Island, Elizabeth Valley, Howard Springs, Mango Farm, Gunbalanya, Territory Wildlife Farm, Thorak Cemetery, and Walker Creek. The tremendous rains also resulted in many areas seeing their wettest March on record.

Widespread flooding resulted from the rains in the region, with some areas becoming isolated by 2 March. Extensive damage was incurred by region's roadways, with losses reaching $12 million. Officials referred to the effects of the flooding as the worst in 40 years. Portions of the Kakadu and Arnhem highways were shut down, with the latter expected to remain so for a week. Throughout the Top End region, a collective 101 bridges and roads were closed due to flooding. Workers at the Ranger Uranium Mine in Jabiru were forced to camp out at the mine as floodwaters overtook the area. The mine's pit was inundated and forced to shut down for nine days while processing had to be suspended for two weeks. The resulting loss in production cost Energy Resources of Australia 300 tonnes (330 tons) of uranium. According to resource analysts, the negative impacts of the flood in addition to lingering effects from Cyclone Monica in 2006 would result in a two percent decrease in the global supply of uranium by 2008. Economic losses sustained by the Energy Resources of Australia were estimated to reach $200 million. At least one house nearby was submerged.

Just south of Jabiru, 35 people were airlifted from the Gagudju Lodge in Cooinda. Helicopters were used to drop food to personnel stranded at outstations in the Kakadu National Park. Severe storms in the park spawned a rare tornado near the Mary River Ranger Station. The 300 m (980 ft) wide twister levelled trees and destroyed caravans along a 3 km (1.9 mi) path. In some cases, trees were even debarked. Based on the damage, the tornado was estimated to have had winds between 230 and 270 km/h (140 and 170 mph). Severe thunderstorms battered Darwin on 3 March with frequent lightning, torrential rain, and destructive wind gusts up to 120 km/h (75 mph). Downed trees and power lines left 10,000 residents without electricity and flooded roadways isolated some in suburban areas. Flight delays were common at Darwin International Airport, while two had to be cancelled. Four people in Adelaide River required rescue from their home. Debris from flooding in the town left main street and a nearby bridge impassible.

The most severe flooding took place in Gunbalanya which saw roughly 930 mm (37 in) of rain in less than a week. Evacuation of 90 people from 47 homes in the town took place on 3 March as rising waters from the local billabong became contaminated with sewage. Residents initially attempted to protect their homes with sandbags but waters rose too fast and over-topped the barrier. Waters reached halfway up homes in the lowest lying areas, with high tide expected to reach 7.2 m (24 ft) on 4 March. Waters began subsiding in the town by 6 March, though low-lying areas remained partially submerged. More than 60 homes sustained flood-related damage. The local school and its library sustained extensive damage, with the latter being damaged beyond repair. An estimated 350 of the 1,400 cattle kept in paddocks near the community were swept away during the flood; at least 70 were known to have drowned by 7 March.

=== Western Australia ===
Most intense Australian cyclones
Rank	Cyclone	Year	Min. pressure
1	Gwenda	1999	900 hPa (26.58 inHg)
1	Inigo	2003	900 hPa (26.58 inHg)
3	George	2007	902 hPa (26.64 inHg)
4	Orson	1989	904 hPa (26.70 inHg)
5	Marcus	2018	905 hPa (26.72 inHg)
6	Theodore	1994	910 hPa (26.87 inHg)
6	Vance	1999	910 hPa (26.87 inHg)
6	Fay	2004	910 hPa (26.87 inHg)
6	Glenda	2006	910 hPa (26.87 inHg)
10	Mahina	1899	914 hPa (26.99 inHg) (Note: Currently, the World Meteorological Organization recognises the lowest pressure of Cyclone Mahina as 27 inches of mercury (914 hPa) based on an observation from the time. A 2014 reconstruction project of Cyclone Mahina by the American Meteorological Society concluded that the 13 metre storm surge produced by the cyclone likely produced barometric pressure levels as low as 880 hPa, which would place it as the strongest tropical cyclone in the Southern Hemisphere, but the metric is not yet approved by the WMO.)
Source: Australian Bureau of Meteorology

Cyclone George was the most powerful cyclone to hit Port Hedland since Cyclone Joan in 1975. The cyclone's peak intensity of 902 hPa (26.64 inHg) with wind gusts of up to 285 kilometres per hour (177 mph) was estimated following Dvorak analysis of satellite imagery.

Power and telephone lines were down in Port Hedland, many roofs and fences were torn down and trees were uprooted. At least one house was destroyed. The Pilbara region was declared a disaster zone, and the Australian Defence Force was on standby to provide extra help. At around 10 p.m on 8 March, the Bureau of Meteorology's Port Hedland weather radar was damaged by the cyclone and was offline for nearly a day. Tropical Cyclone Jacob struck almost the same area as George only three days later, although it was not as damaging or deadly as George. It did however cause some minor flooding.

Three people were killed and twenty-eight others were injured as a result of the severe cyclone. One death and the majority of the people injured occurred at a Fortescue Metals Group camp, about 100 km (62.13 mi) south of Port Hedland. Strong winds and flooding delayed the rescue efforts for most of the day. However, all injured workers were airlifted to the hospital in Port Hedland after the cyclone passed. The deaths occurred when strong winds knocked over temporary accommodation shelters known as dongas. The second death occurred at Indee station, located between Port Hedland and the mining camp. The man died from severe internal injuries while escaping from his wrecked donga, trying to seek help at the main station homestead. A third death occurred when a man who was transferred to a Perth hospital on 11 March died due to the injuries received when the cyclone hit at the Fortescue camp.

== Aftermath ==
=== Northern Territory ===
Starting on 7 March, the Gunbalanya Health Clinic began warning residents of a possible melioidosis outbreak resulting from the floods. They urged residents to wear shoes and wash their hands before eating to avoid infection. More than a dozen people contracted the disease over the following weeks, with two dying as a result. Three others were hospitalised in the Royal Darwin Hospital. Reconstruction of roads in and around Darwin began by 9 March; however, portions of the Arnhem Highway remained under water. The Department of Planning and Infrastructure stated that a 15 m (49 ft) bridge would have to be constructed over the West Alligator River where a culvert collapsed. The $1.2 million bridge was completed on 5 April and allowed Arnhem Highway to completely re-open. Repair work on roads continued for more than a month, with additional rains in the following weeks creating additional potholes. A week after the floods, there was some concern over a delay in aid from the government; however, authorities assured that supplies would be provided in a timely manner once need assessments were complete. The Salvation Army began collecting supplies for the 90 people rendered homeless by 13 March with additional requests for assistance made to the Australian Red Cross. Shipments of supplies to Gunbalanya began on 20 March, with a total of 14 flights scheduled over two days. The airlifts brought more than $200,000 worth of goods, consisting of mattresses, blankets, sheets, refrigerators, washing machines, and stoves, to the community.

=== Western Australia ===
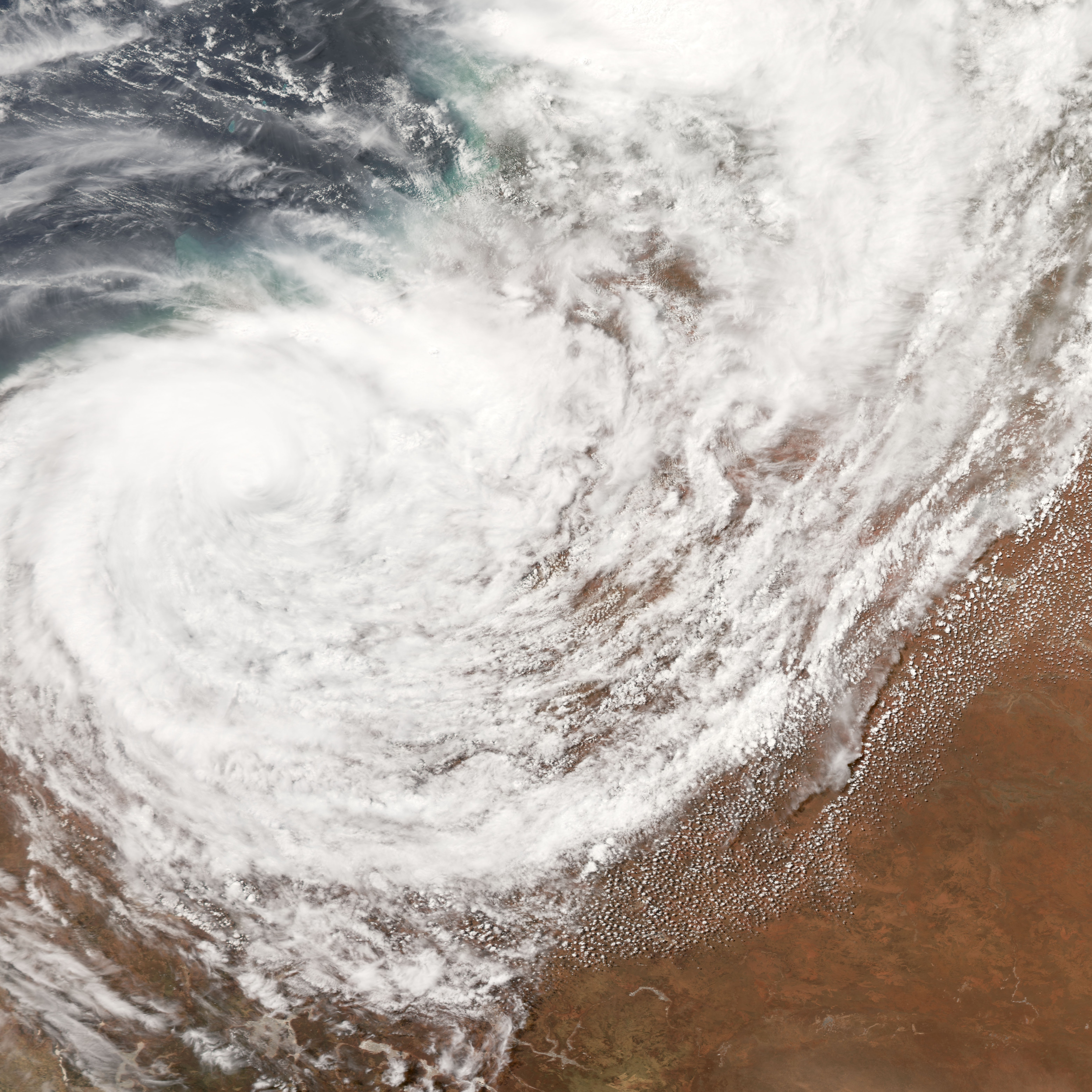
Cyclone George weakening inland over Western Australia on 9 March

On 9 March, Prime Minister John Howard announced that persons injured by the storm or those whom lost their home would be eligible for funding through the Australian Government Disaster Recovery Payment program. The initiative ultimately provided 530 people with a collective $630,000 in aid.

After Cyclone George struck the Pilbara coast, a relief fund was set up to help the victims of the storm. Mining companies, business, and residents all donated money to assist with the cause, and within 48 hours the town of Port Hedland was able to raise just over $520,000 BHP also helped recover Port Hedland by giving the local government $1 million each year which will fund for a large part of an enhancement scheme with the Western Australian State Government to improve the town's appearance. Schools in South Hedland remained closed due to safety concerns about the damage caused by cyclones George and Jacob until 19 March, after the local community joined in a massive clean-up.

In commemoration of the deaths that took place, the Fortescue Metals Group commissioned the McNally Newton Landscape Architects to construct a memorial in South Hedland. Acclaimed sculptor Ron Gomboc designed a 12 m (39 ft) twisted, steel monument for the project. The memorial was opened in March 2009, two years after the storm.

==== Lawsuits ====
The Australian Workers' Union (AWU) launched a scathing attack on the Fortescue Metals Group, saying they were disgraced that no evacuation took place before the cyclone hit. The AWU were also concerned about the buildings at the campsite as they were only built to withstand a Category 2 cyclone. Almost all of the buildings located at the camp site were destroyed. Fortescue and its subsidiary the Pilbara Infrastructure (TPI) were charged with a combined 18 counts of failing to provide or maintain a safe workplace over Cyclone George and appeared in Perth Magistrates Court. The Magistrate dismissed all charges and when that decision was appealed to the Supreme Court of Western Australia the appeal was also dismissed, with Justice Stephen Hall finding that Fortescue had met their duty to provide a safe workplace by engaging "qualified and experienced experts" to manage the dongas. Both courts had heard that the company contracted to build the dongas, NT Link, had given assurances to Fortescue that the dongas had been constructed to industry standards when it had not. NT Link was granted immunity from prosecution in exchange for its testimony against Fortescue.

== See also ==
- Other storms named George
- List of cyclones in Western Australia
