= 2006–07 Australian region cyclone season =

Tropical cyclone season

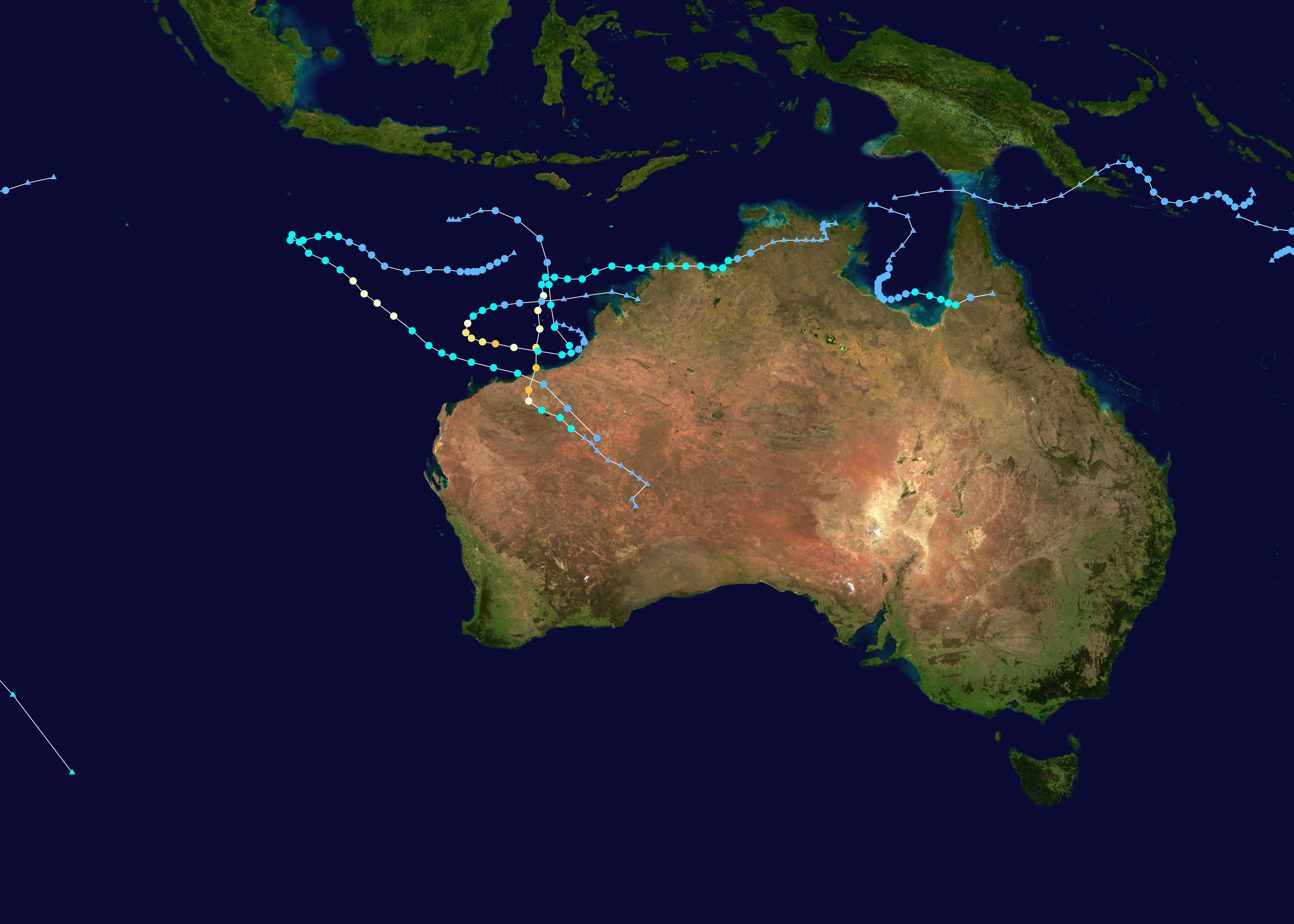
- Season summary map

Seasonal boundaries
- First system formed: 30 December 2006
- Last system dissipated: 18 May 2007

Strongest storm
- Name: George
  - Maximum winds: 205 km/h (125 mph) (10-minute sustained)
  - Lowest pressure: 902 hPa (mbar)

Seasonal statistics
- Tropical lows: 8
- Tropical cyclones: 5
- Severe tropical cyclones: 3
- Total fatalities: 5
- Total damage: $15.7 million (2007 USD)

Related articles
- 2006–07 South-West Indian Ocean cyclone season; 2006–07 South Pacific cyclone season

The 2006–07 Australian region cyclone season was a below average tropical cyclone season. It began on 1 November 2006 and ended on 30 April 2007; however, Tropical Cyclone Pierre formed on 17 May, after the official end date. The regional tropical cyclone operational plan also defines a tropical cyclone year separately from a tropical cyclone season, which runs from 1 July 2006 to 30 June 2007.

Tropical cyclones in this area are monitored by four Tropical Cyclone Warning Centres (TCWCs): the Australian Bureau of Meteorology in Perth, Darwin, and Brisbane; and TCWC Port Moresby in Papua New Guinea.

== Systems ==
=== Tropical Low Isobel ===
- Tropical low (Australian scale)
- Tropical storm (SSHWS)
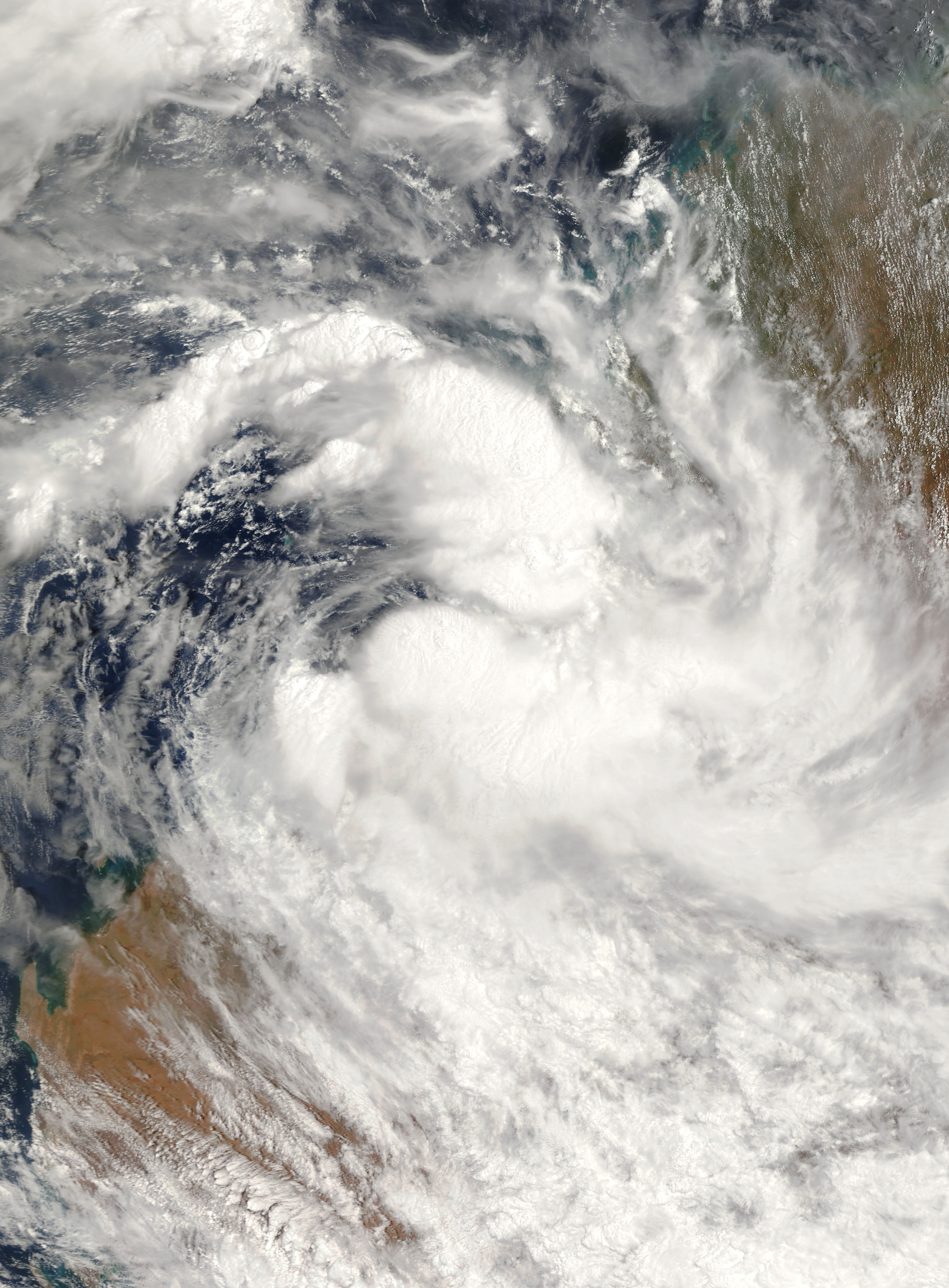
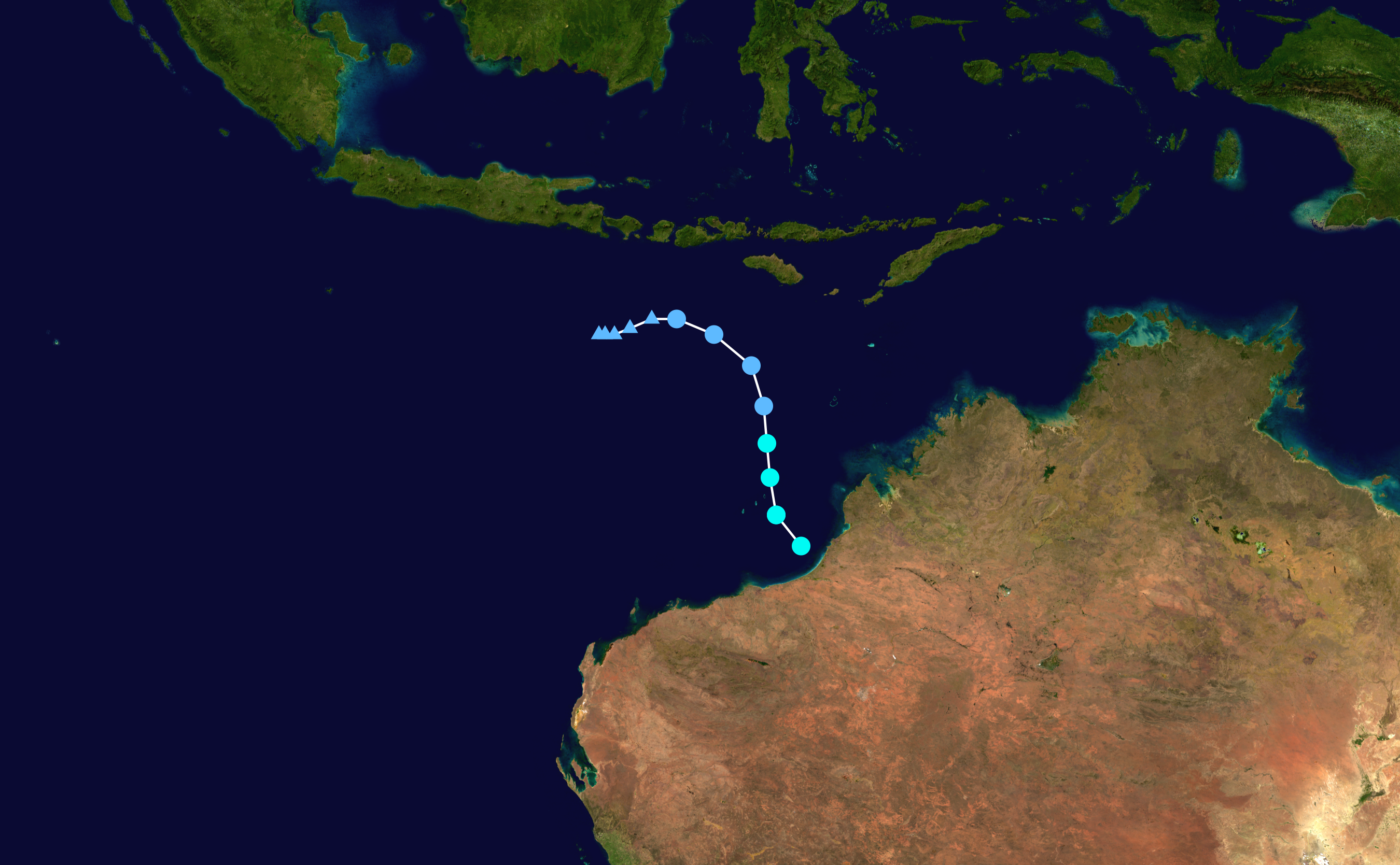
- Duration: 30 December – 5 January
- Peak intensity: 85 km/h (50 mph) (10-min); 982 hPa (mbar)

An area of increased thunderstorm activity south of Indonesia was first spotted on 29 December 2006, when the Bureau of Meteorology (BOM) noted that a weak tropical low could develop in the area. Late on 31 December, the BOM began issuing advisories on the tropical low. The Joint Typhoon Warning Center issued a Tropical Cyclone Formation Alert on the system early on 2 January 2007, and the Tropical Cyclone Warning Centre in Perth upgraded it to a tropical cyclone later that morning, naming it Isobel. The JTWC followed suit and designated the system Tropical Cyclone 07S. Isobel was downgraded to a tropical low shortly after landfall over the Eighty Mile Beach on 3 January and advisories were stopped at 0600 UTC that morning. The remnants of Isobel merged with a deep low-pressure system near the southern coast of Western Australia, dumping 100 mm of torrential rain, in what was dubbed a "perfect storm". The extratropical system halted mining operations and unleashed winds of up to 120 km/h.

After the system dissipated, the BOM de-classified Isobel as a tropical cyclone as post-storm analysis showed that it did not have a well enough defined center to qualify as a tropical cyclone.

=== Tropical Cyclone Nelson ===
- Category 2 tropical cyclone (Australian scale)
- Tropical storm (SSHWS)
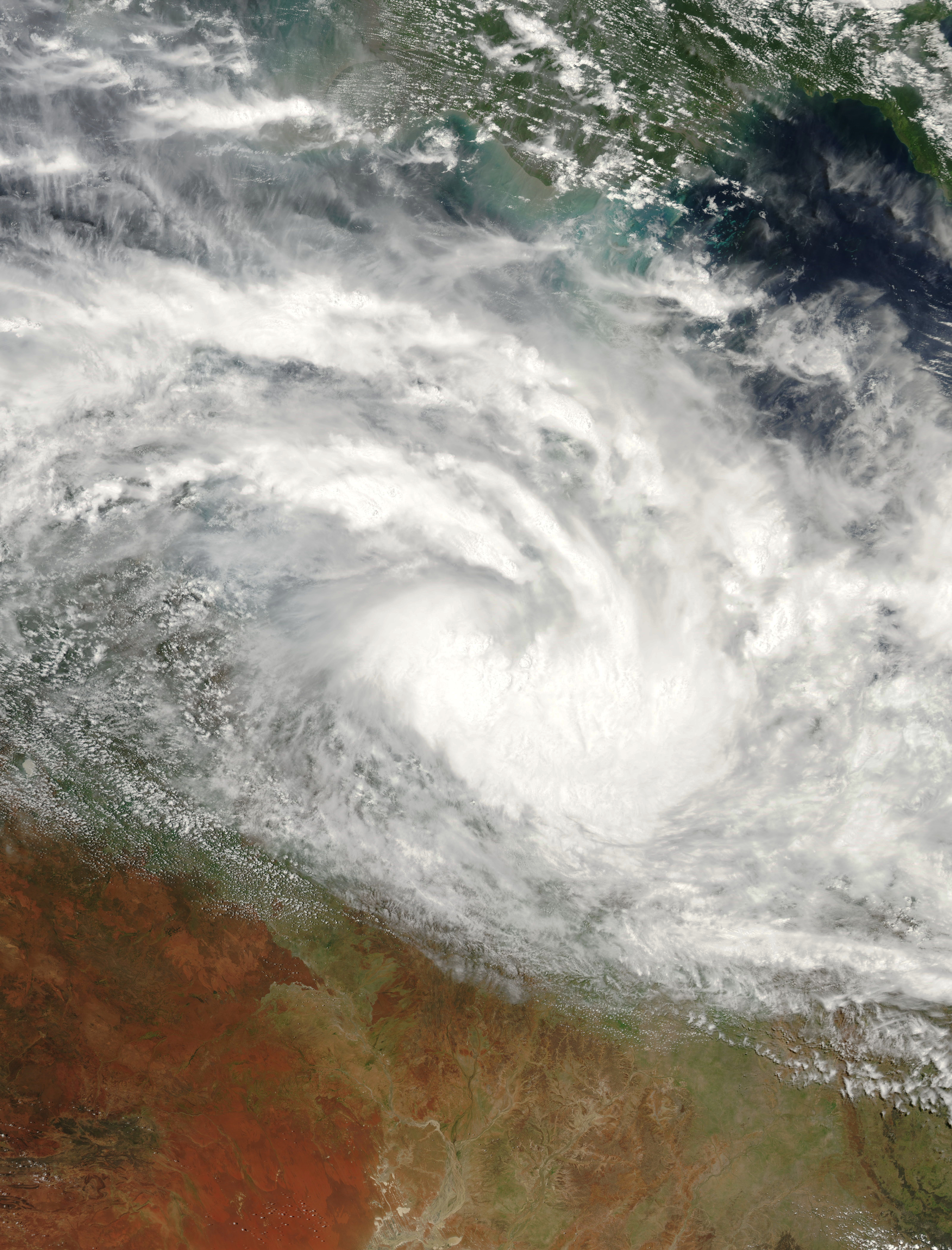
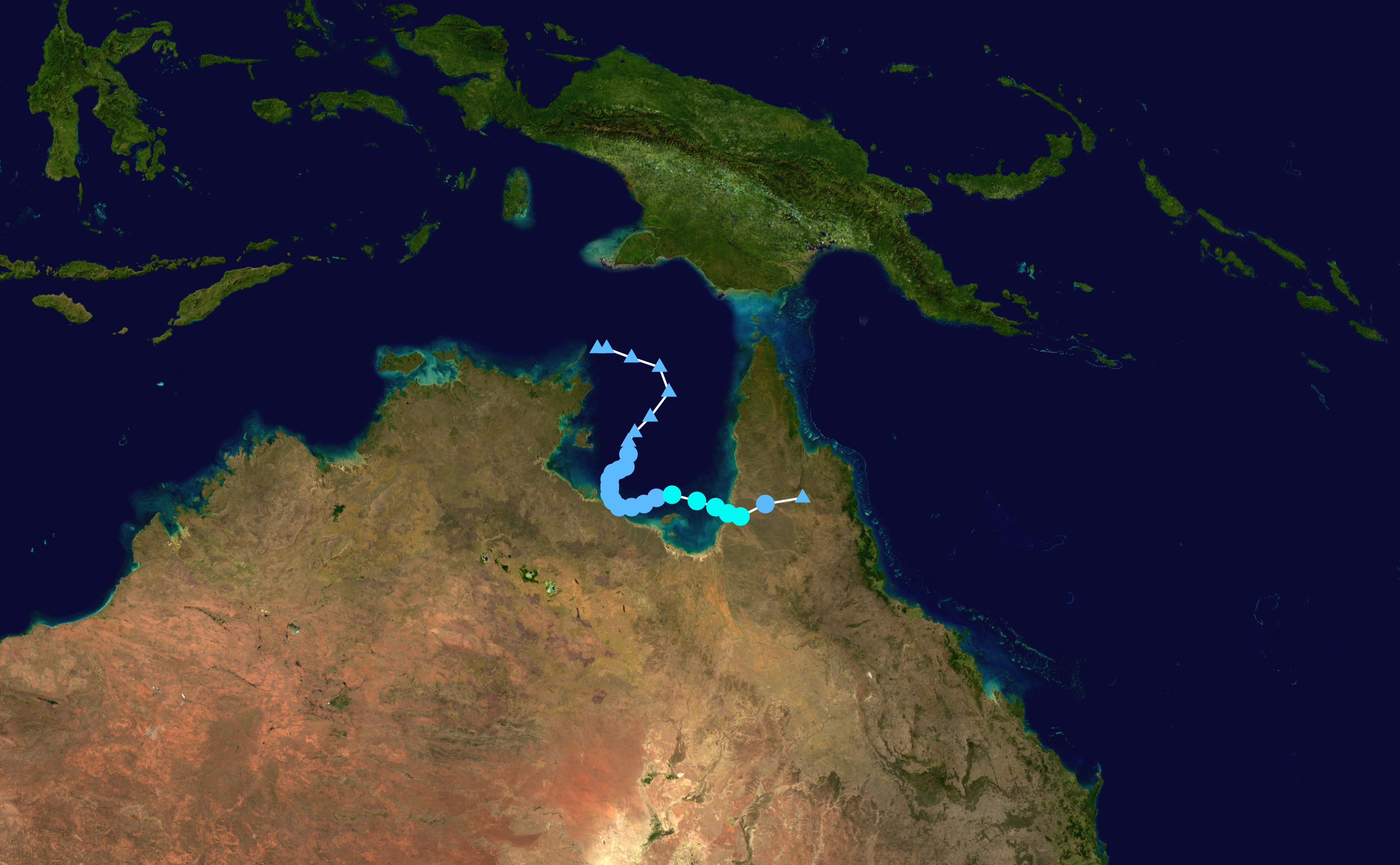
- Duration: 5 February – 7 February
- Peak intensity: 95 km/h (60 mph) (10-min); 985 hPa (mbar)

On 30 January, a tropical low was identified by the Tropical Cyclone Warning Centre in Darwin. It deepened as it moved east just north of the Northern Territory coastline and a cyclone watch was declared for eastern parts of the Northern Territory on 31 January. Cyclone warnings were issued on 1 February in the same area, while cyclone watches extended to most areas surrounding the Gulf of Carpentaria. The Joint Typhoon Warning Center issued a Tropical Cyclone Formation Alert (TCFA) on the developing low on 1 February. However, this was cancelled on 3 February after the low showed no signs of developing. The low tracked to the southwest and approached the southern coastline of the Gulf of Carpentaria, before moving eastwards towards Queensland. On 5 February, the JTWC reissued their TCFA on the system, while the Tropical Cyclone Warning Centre in Brisbane upgraded the system to tropical cyclone status, naming it Nelson, as well as issuing cyclone warnings for the Queensland coast surrounding the Gulf. The cyclone intensified to a Category 2 on the Australian scale late on 6 February and peaked while crossing the coast with gusts reaching 140 km/h (85 mph). Nelson was once forecast to reintensify in the Coral Sea and the east Queensland coast faced a cyclone watch for the first time this season. However, Nelson was later declared dissipated over southwestern Cape York Peninsula while a new low was detected just off Cairns on 6 February.

=== TCWC Brisbane Tropical Low ===
- Tropical low (Australian scale)
- Duration: 5 February – 8 February
- Peak intensity: 85 km/h (50 mph) (10-min); 995 hPa (mbar)

Just east of the remnants of Nelson, a tropical low was detected on 6 February. The low absorbed the moisture from Nelson as it moved slowly away from the coast. On 7 February, the TCWC in Brisbane issued their last tropical cyclone advisory. In that advisory they noted that low would gradually intensify over the next 24 to 48 hours, however it was not expected to develop into a tropical cyclone until it was well away from the coast of Australia. On 8 February, the low continued to move to the east southeast but was in an unfavourable environment for intensification. The TCWC in Brisbane stopped issuing ocean wind warnings on the system on 9 February.

=== Tropical Low Humba ===
- Tropical low (Australian scale)
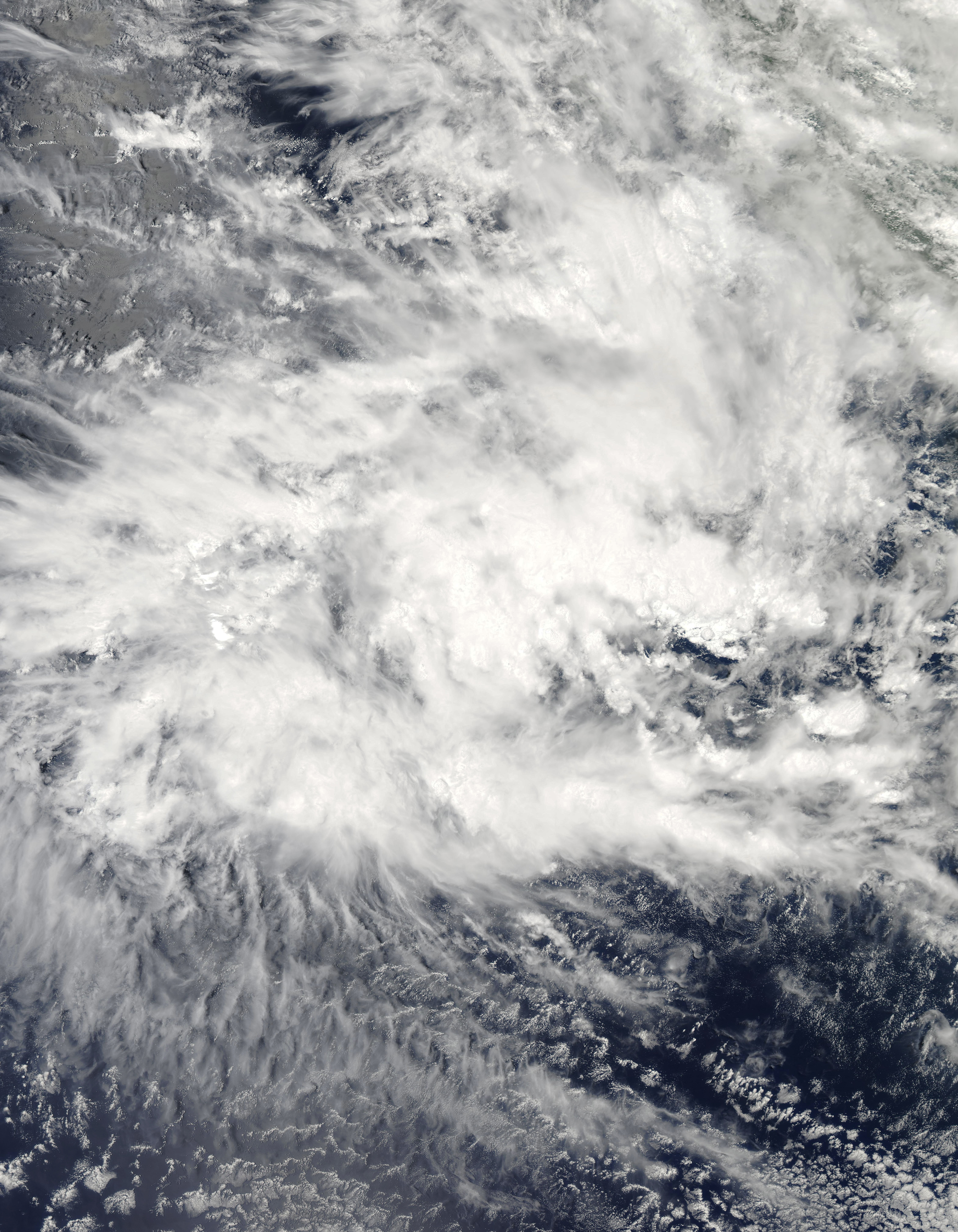
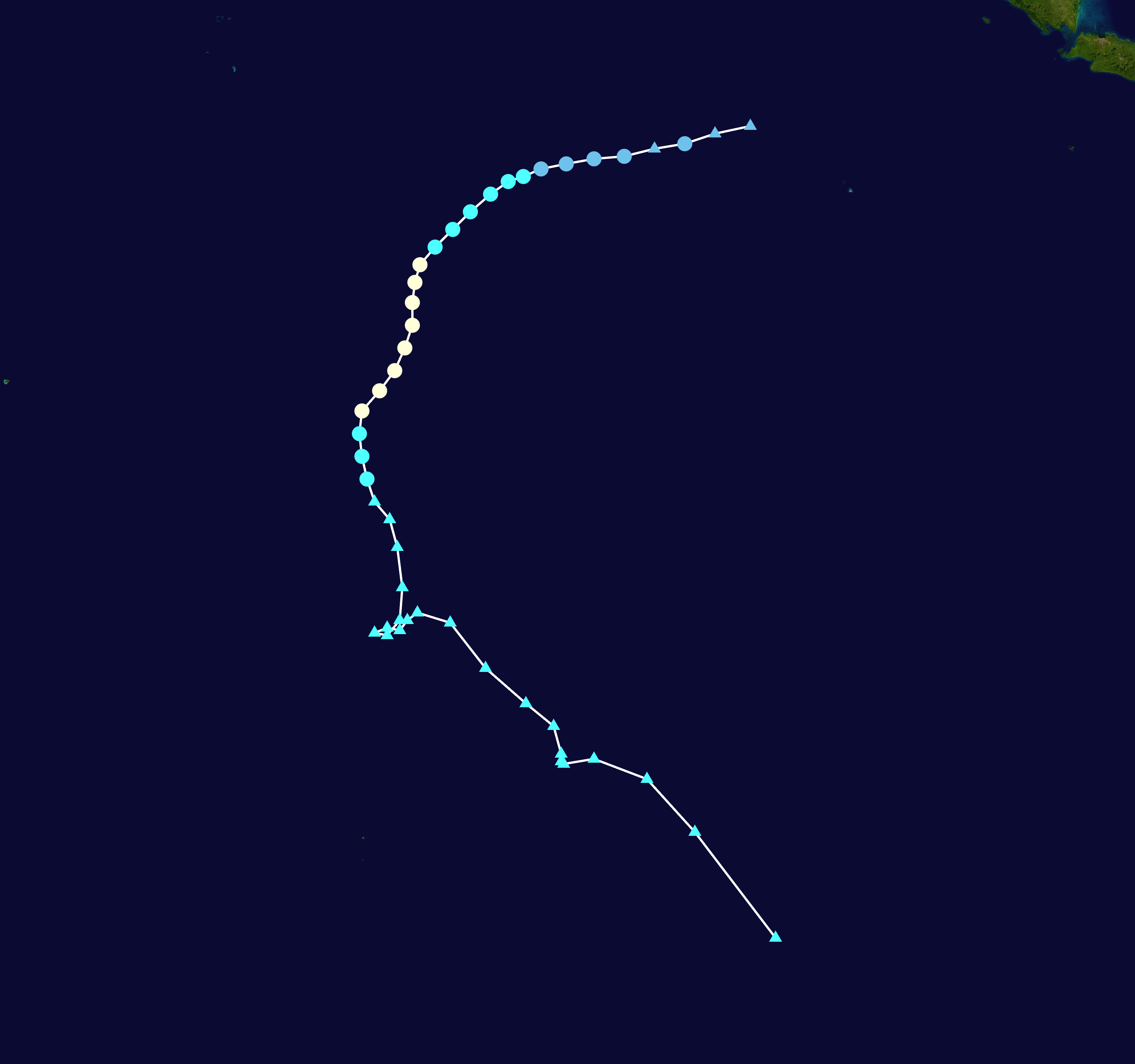
- Duration: 19 February – 20 February (exited basin)
- Peak intensity: 75 km/h (45 mph) (10-min); 1000 hPa (mbar)

=== Tropical Low Odette ===
- Tropical low (Australian scale)
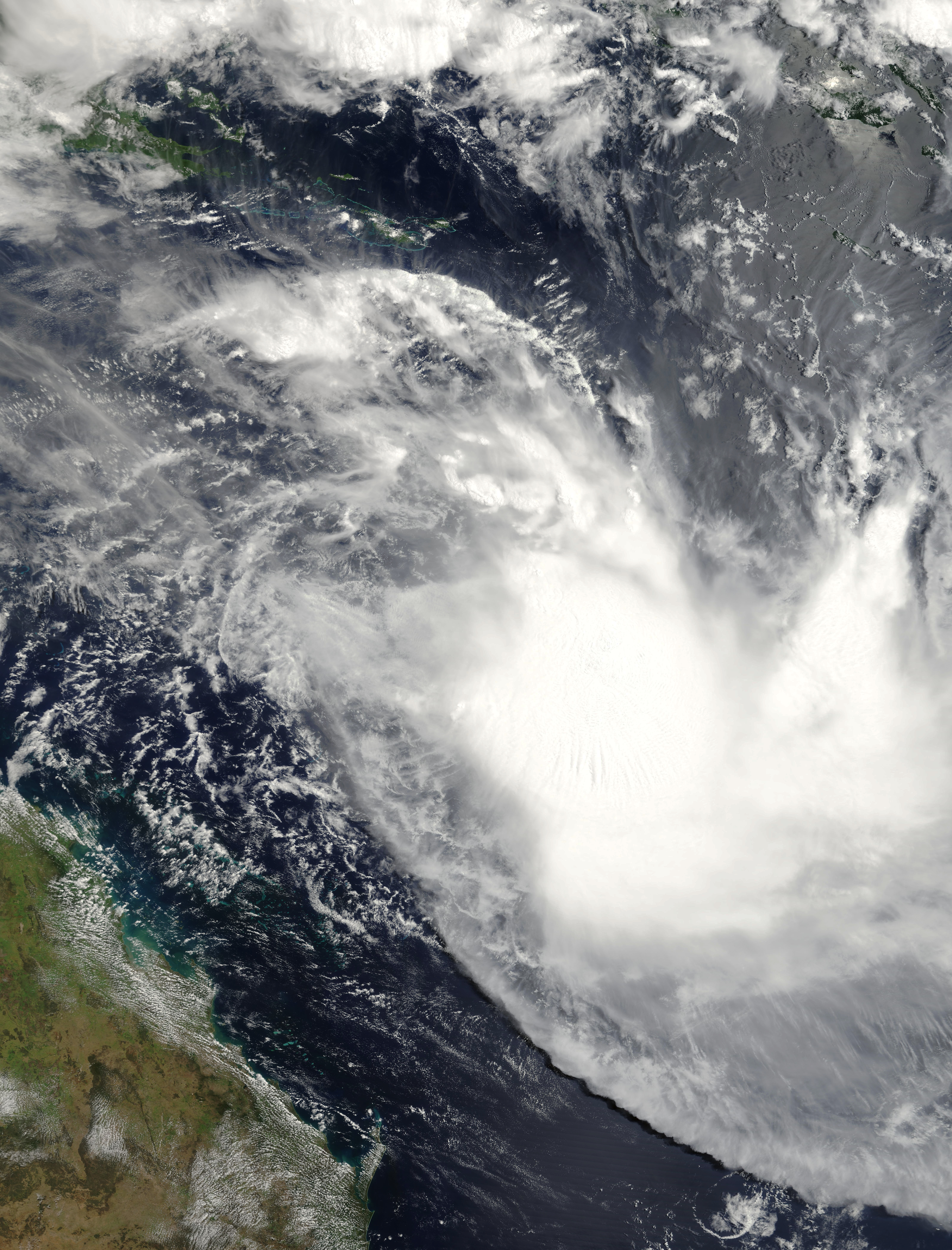
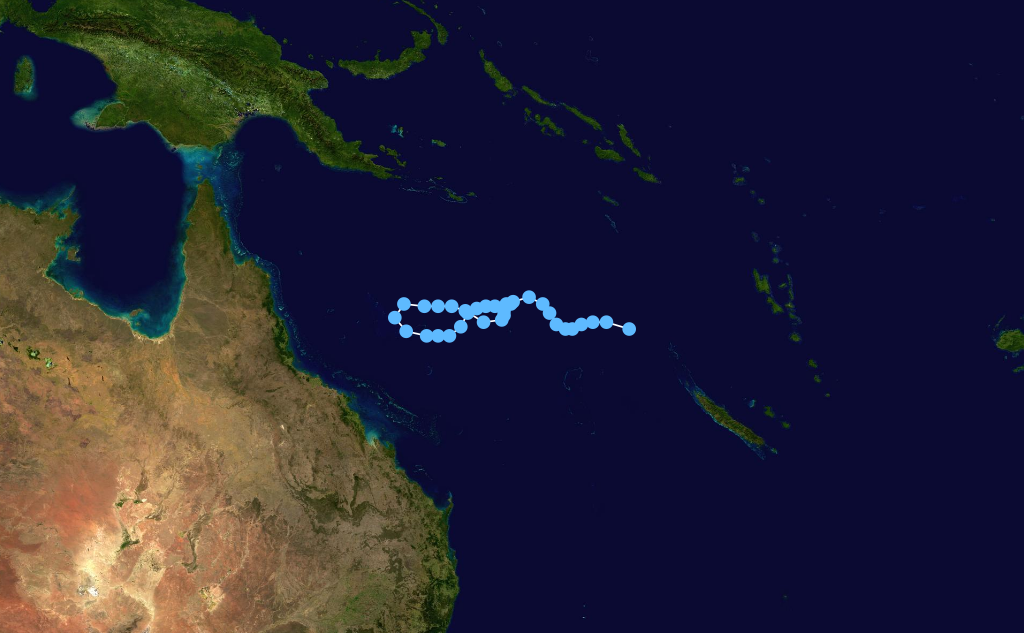
- Duration: 2 March – 5 March
- Peak intensity: 75 km/h (45 mph) (10-min); 990 hPa (mbar)

On 2 March, the TCWC in Brisbane, Queensland started issuing tropical cyclone advisories on a tropical low east of 150°E, which had formed in a monsoon trough. With the first advice, a cyclone watch was immediately declared for the Queensland coast between Ayr and St Lawrence, and TCWC Brisbane upgraded the low to Tropical Cyclone Odette on 3 March. Cyclone advisories were discontinued later that day when Odette remained near stationary in the Coral Sea. The Joint Typhoon Warning Center on that day issued a Tropical Cyclone Formation Alert on the developing cyclone. Early on 4 March, the JTWC cancelled the TCFA as Odette encountered high vertical wind shear in the Coral Sea. However, the system was still causing rough seas and swells along the coast of Queensland. Later that day, the BOM reported that there were no more ship observations of gales near the centre of the storm, and downgraded Odette to a tropical low noting that redevelopment was unlikely. On 6 March, the TCWC in Brisbane, Queensland noted the potential for redevelopment, and the remnants of Odette passed into the area of responsibility of RSMC Nadi early the next day. However, redevelopment did not occur, and tropical disturbance advisories were discontinued.

Odette was subsequently downgraded below tropical cyclone intensity by the warning agency in Brisbane.

=== Severe Tropical Cyclone George ===
- Category 5 severe tropical cyclone (Australian scale)
- Category 3 tropical cyclone (SSHWS)
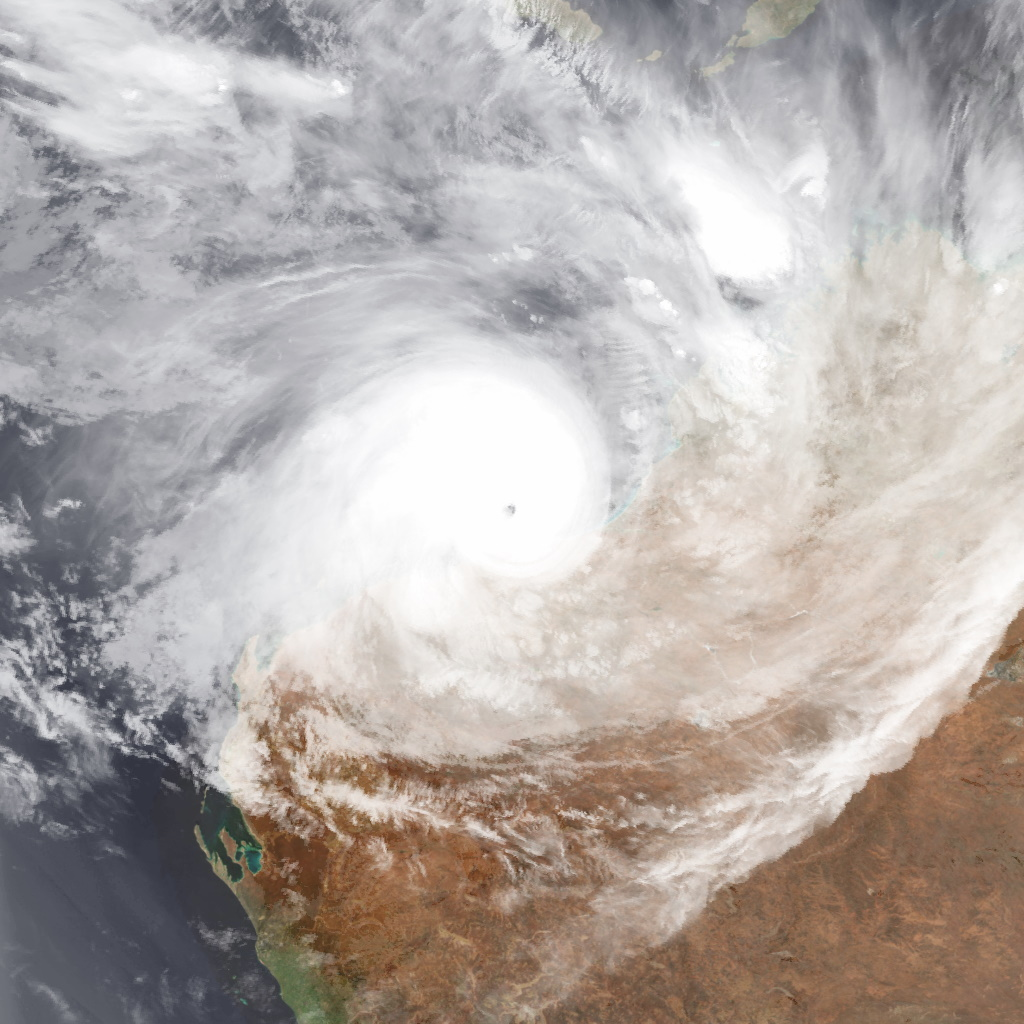
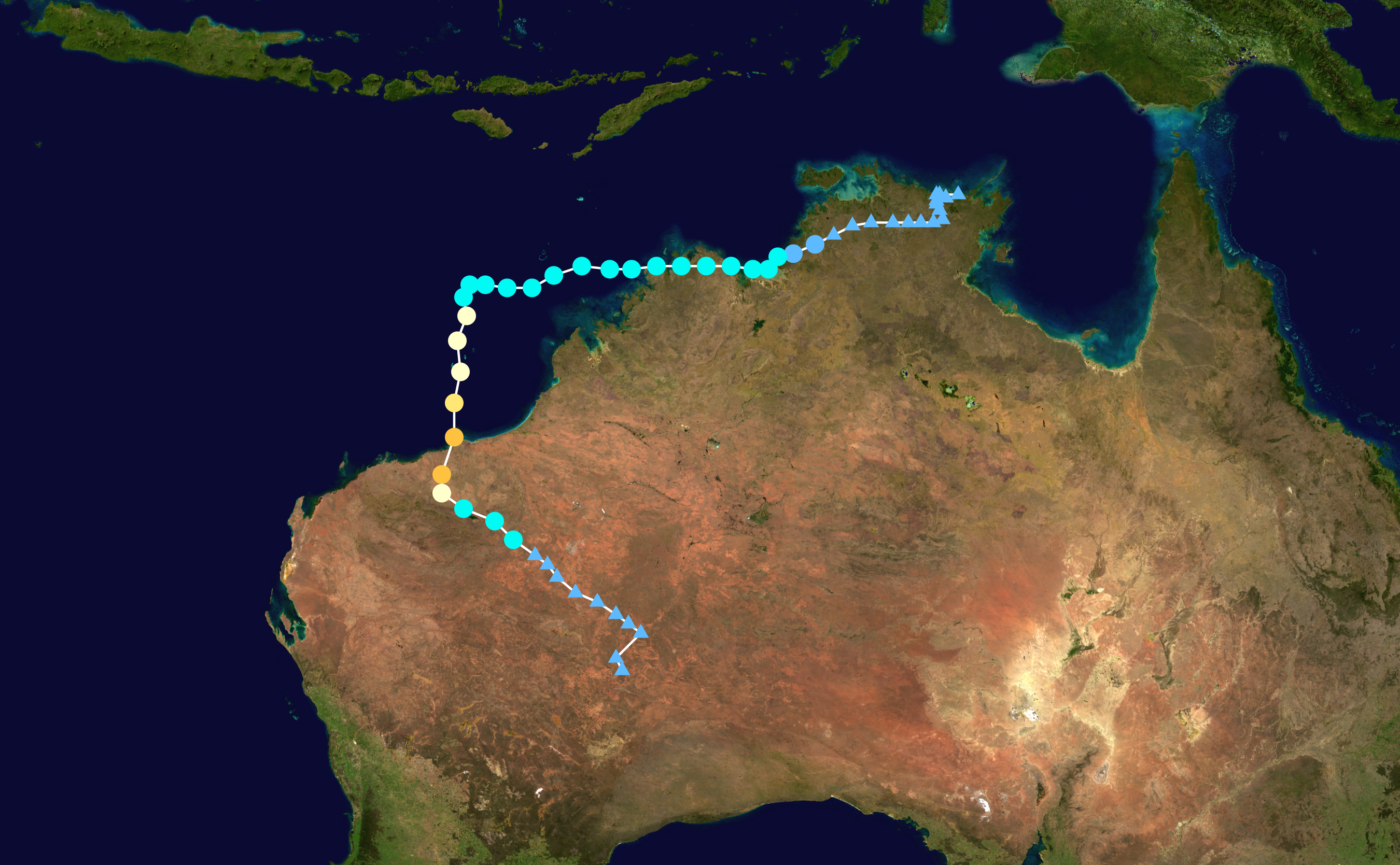
- Duration: 3 March – 10 March
- Peak intensity: 205 km/h (125 mph) (10-min); 902 hPa (mbar)

A tropical low that had been centered over land in the Northern Territory's Top End since 27 February started showing signs of development, and the Tropical Cyclone Warning Centre in Darwin initiated tropical cyclone advisories on 2 March while the low was still inland. The Joint Typhoon Warning Center issued a Tropical Cyclone Formation Alert on the system later that day, and designated it Tropical Cyclone 17S the next day as it emerged into water.

Later on 3 March, TCWC Darwin upgraded the low to a tropical cyclone, naming it George, the first name used from the Darwin list since Fay in March 2004. George continued to strengthen, and was upgraded to a Category 2 tropical cyclone. It made landfall on 4 March in the Kimberley region of Western Australia on the western coast of the Joseph Bonaparte Gulf. The tropical cyclone weakened and the BOM downgraded it to a tropical low after it moved over land, but this weakening was short lived however, as it almost immediately reintensified into a Category 1 tropical cyclone when it started to move off the Kimberley coast.

The Tropical Cyclone Warning Centre in Perth began monitoring the re-developed cyclone as it moved westward. Initially, poor organisation inhibited any strengthening, but George moved into more favourable conditions and quickly reorganised itself, becoming a severe tropical cyclone on 7 March. The severe cyclone turned abruptly to the south later that day, moving closer to the Pilbara coast, while growing significantly in size. As George continued to move southwards towards Bedout Island on 8 March, George was upgraded a Category 4 cyclone with 10-min sustained winds of 105 knots. Post analysis, however, lifted George's peak intensity to 110 knots just before it made landfall, and George was upgraded to a Category 5 cyclone. Cyclone George made landfall just east of Port Hedland at around 10 pm WDT (1300 UTC) on that day while it was still at its peak intensity and a minimum pressure of 902 hPa.

The JTWC issued its final warning on George early the next day as it was barely hanging on to Category 3 tropical cyclone status. George weakened slowly while over land and it was downgraded to a Category 2 late on 9 March. The next day TCWC in Perth issued its final warning.

Cyclone George was the most powerful cyclone to hit Port Hedland since Cyclone Joan in 1975. Three people were killed and twenty-eight others were injured as a result of the severe cyclone.

=== Severe Tropical Cyclone Jacob ===
- Category 3 severe tropical cyclone (Australian scale)
- Category 1 tropical cyclone (SSHWS)
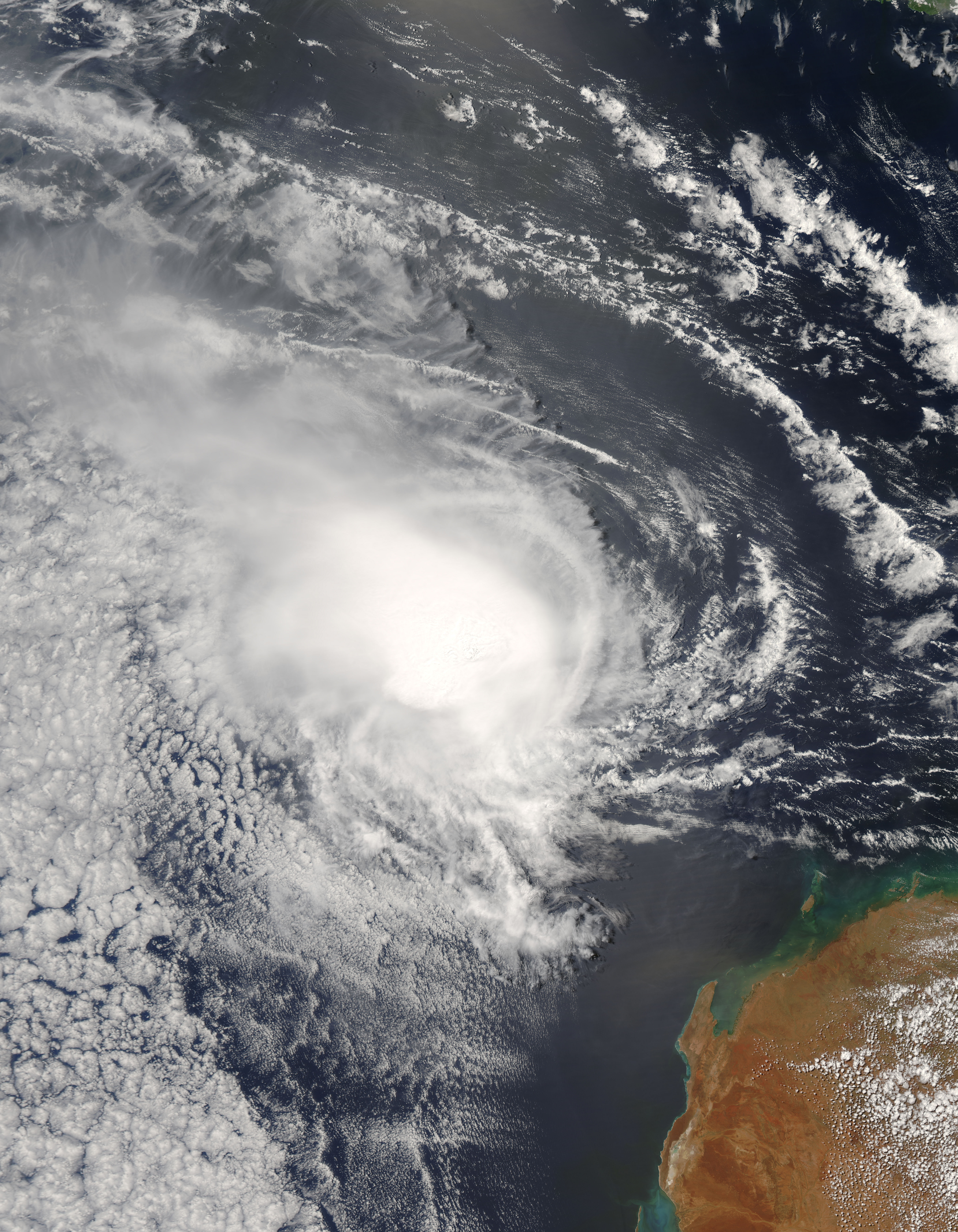
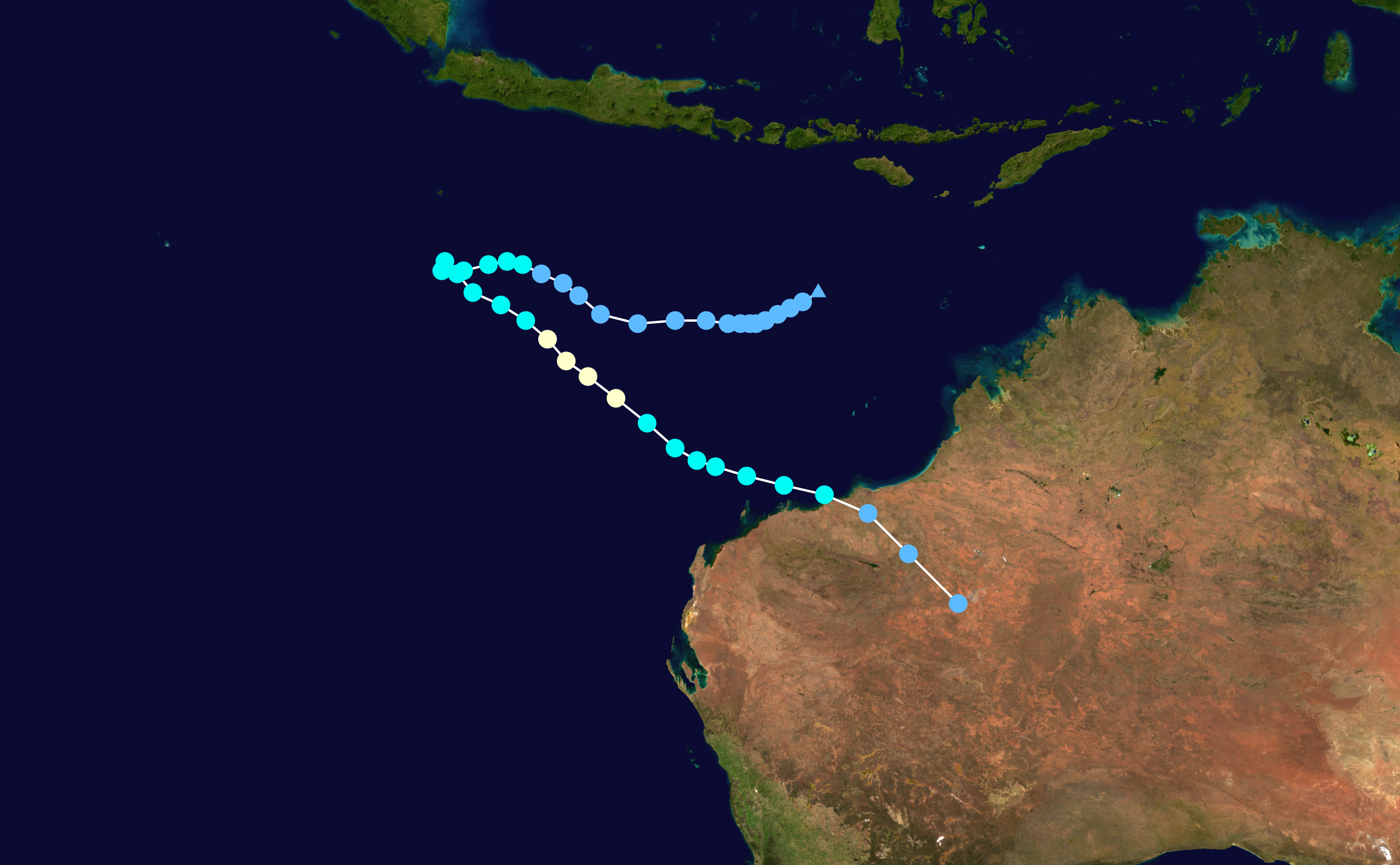
- Duration: 3 March – 12 March
- Peak intensity: 130 km/h (80 mph) (10-min); 971 hPa (mbar)

A tropical low formed in the Timor Sea off the Kimberley coast on 2 March and moved slowly in a westerly direction. It intensified slowly and was not expected to develop to a tropical cyclone. However, on early 7 March, convection improved slightly around the system, and the Tropical Cyclone Warning Centre in Perth named it Jacob as it intensified to tropical cyclone status. A cyclone watch was immediately issued for Christmas Island, as Jacob moved to the west northwest closer to the island. The Joint Typhoon Warning Center designated the system Tropical Cyclone 18S on the same day. Jacob was also upgraded to a Category 2 tropical cyclone by the TCWC in Perth. Jacob continued to strengthen into a Category 3 severe tropical cyclone on 8 March, but weakened shortly after back to a Category 2. Jacob slowed down its movement during the day and began to move eastward away from Christmas Island, therefore, cyclone warnings were cancelled. Jacob restrengthened to a Category 3 on 9 March and accelerated to the southeast towards the Australian mainland. After just being hit by Severe Tropical Cyclone George the night before, TCWC Perth began issuing cyclone watches for Cyclone Jacob for the entire Pilbara coast later that day. The next day, Jacob once again weakened to a Category 2 tropical cyclone. The Bureau of Meteorology forecast Jacob to intensify to a Category 3 cyclone again before landfall, but this did not materialise and Jacob instead weakened further to a Category 1 cyclone on 11 March. Jacob weakened into a tropical low shortly after making landfall east of Port Hedland, Western Australia on 12 March.

=== Severe Tropical Cyclone Kara ===
- Category 4 severe tropical cyclone (Australian scale)
- Category 3 tropical cyclone (SSHWS)
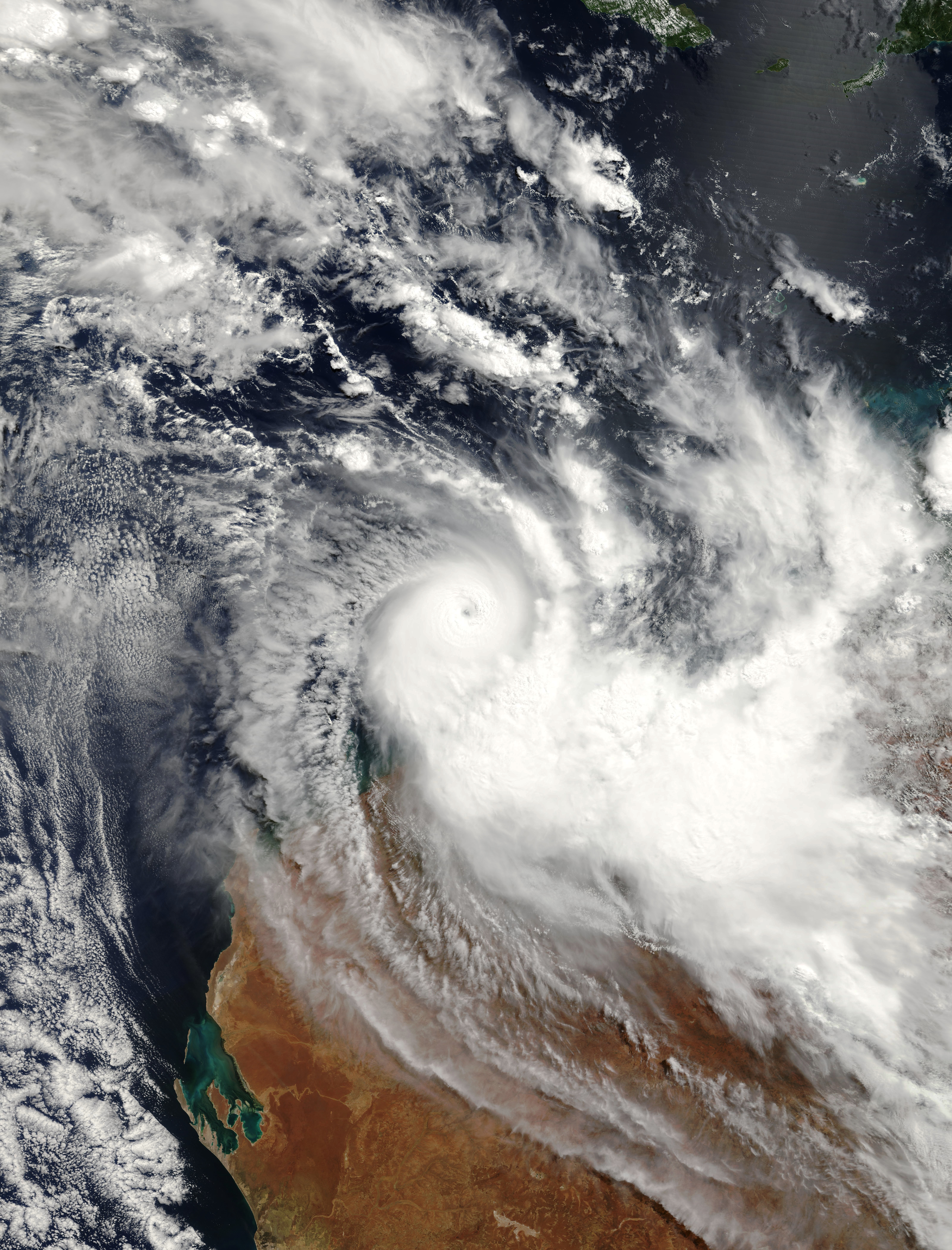
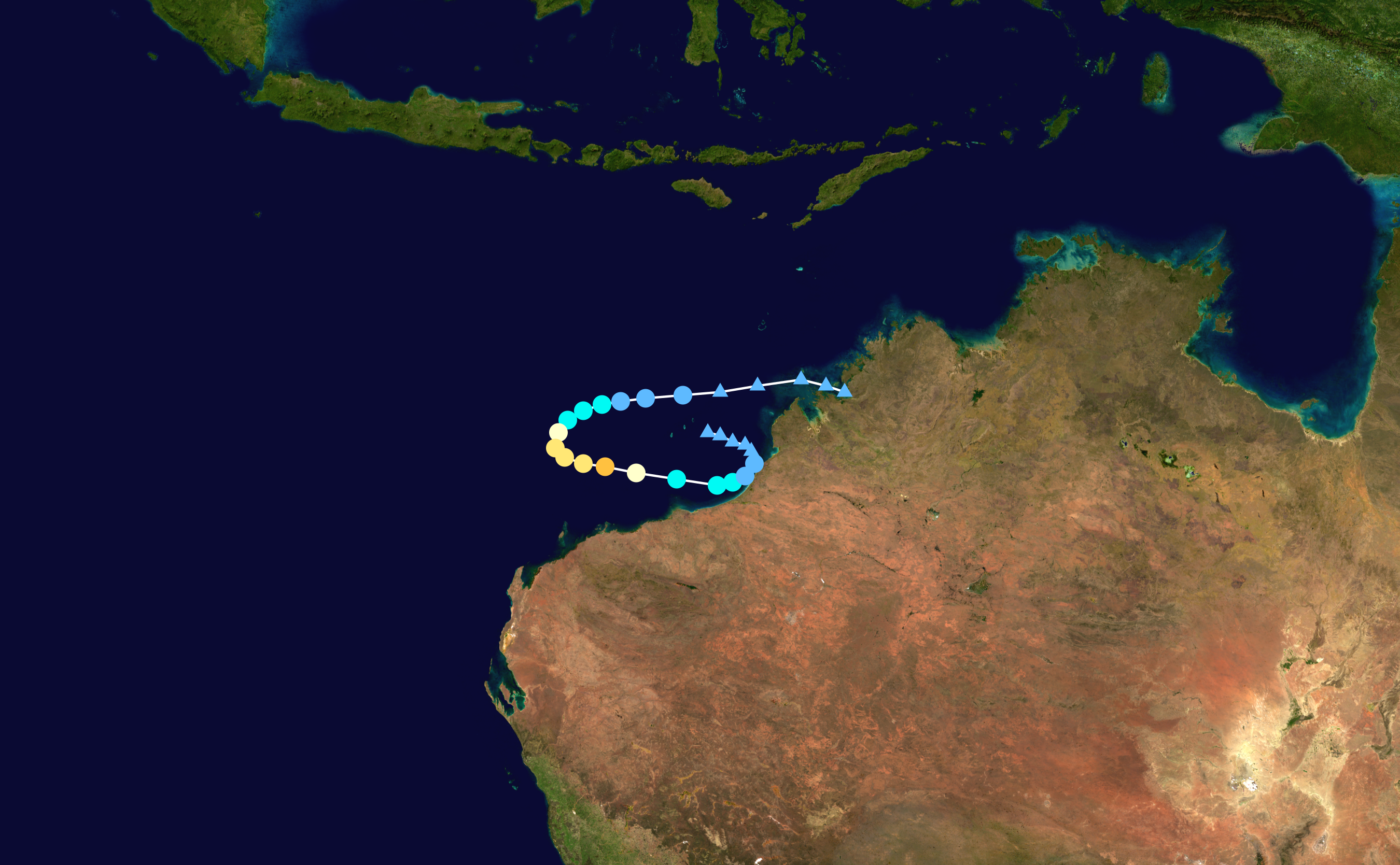
- Duration: 24 March – 28 March
- Peak intensity: 195 km/h (120 mph) (10-min); 941 hPa (mbar)

On 24 March, TCWC Perth started issuing tropical cyclone advisories on a developing tropical low that had moved off land into waters off the Kimberley coast. It gained sizeable organisation, and the JTWC issued a Tropical Cyclone Formation Alert early on 25 March. Several hours later, it was named Tropical Cyclone Kara, with scatterometer readings of 40 knots to the south of the system. Kara intensified quickly, and the BOM upgraded it to Category 2 on the Australian scale later that day, then to a severe tropical cyclone early on 26 March. It then underwent rapid development, due to its small size and a favourable environment, and reached Category 3 severe tropical cyclone strength.

At this point, the Bureau of Meteorology had high uncertainty regarding the cyclone's future track, which generally pointed Kara to move southwards towards the Western Australian coast. Therefore, cyclone watches and warnings were issued for the entire Pilbara coast, extending as far east as Broome. The cyclone reached peak intensity late on 26 March, and began to rapidly weaken the next day due to increasing wind shear. The JTWC issued its last advisory on the evening of 27 March, and TCWC Perth followed suit early on 28 March as Kara dissipated near Eighty Mile Beach in Australia.

=== Tropical Cyclone Pierre ===
- Category 1 tropical cyclone (Australian scale)
- Tropical depression (SSHWS)
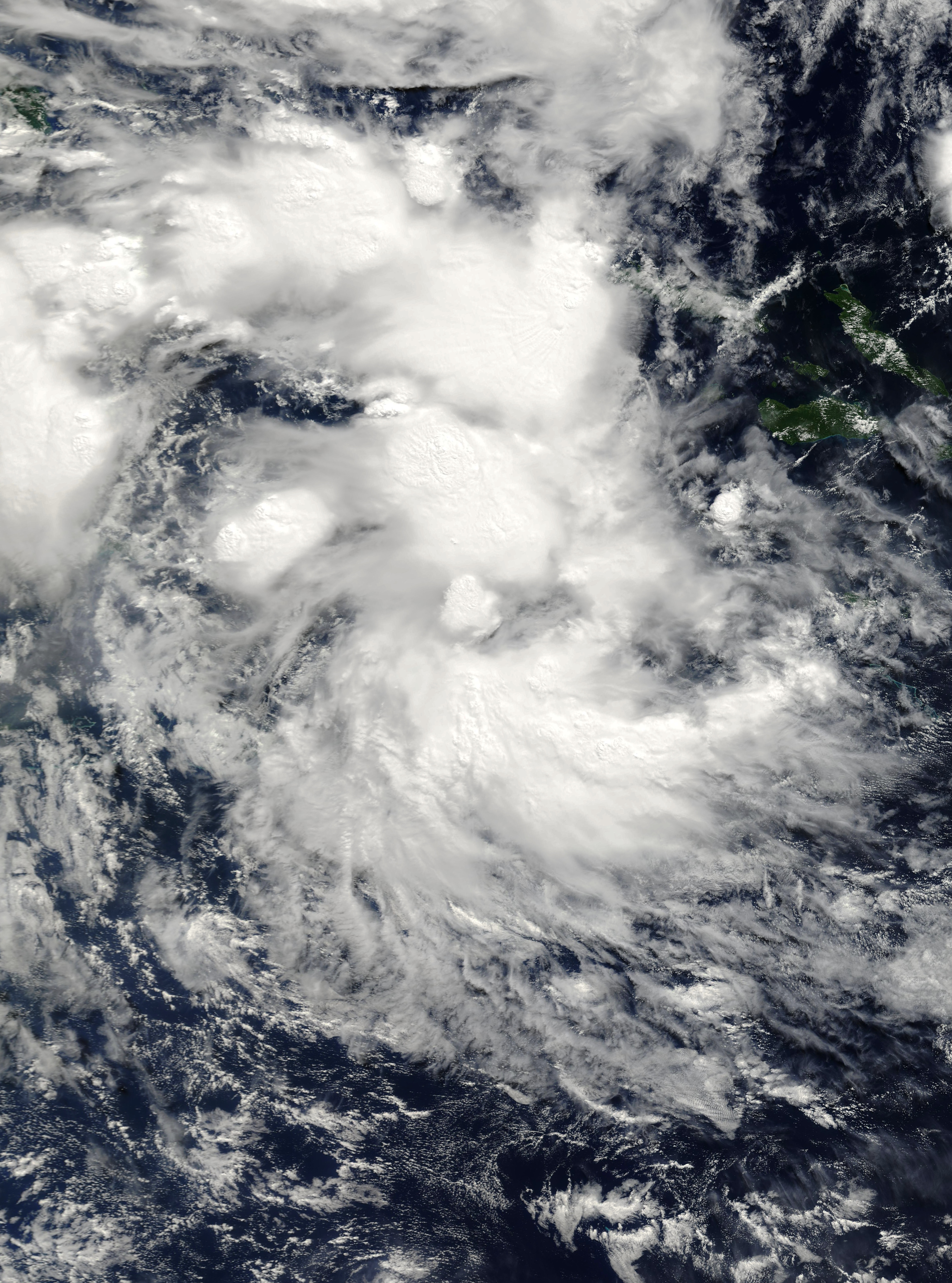
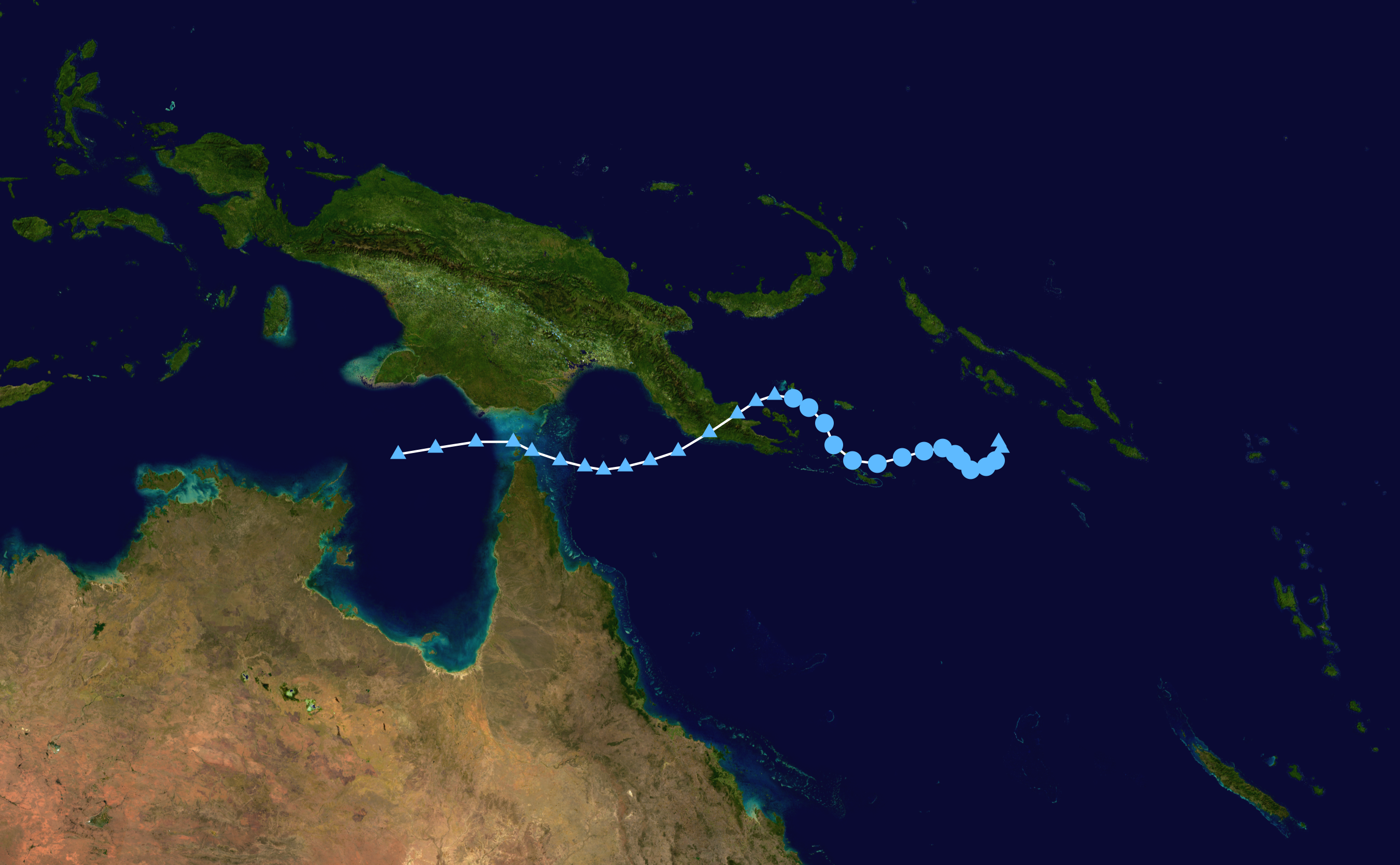
- Duration: 16 May – 18 May
- Peak intensity: 75 km/h (45 mph) (10-min); 990 hPa (mbar)

Early on 16 May, slightly more than two weeks after the official end to the Australian cyclone season, the Tropical Cyclone Warning Centre in Brisbane identified a tropical low east-southeast of Papua New Guinea. The low organised quickly in the Soloman Sea, and the Joint Typhoon Warning Center issued a Tropical Cyclone Formation Alert on it several hours later. TCWC Brisbane named the system Tropical Cyclone Pierre early the next day. The JTWC issued its first advisory on Tropical Cyclone 24P several hours later, as the cyclone moved westward. Later that day, Pierre encountered increased wind shear and dry air, disrupting the system and inhibiting its development. These unfavourable conditions eventually caused the system to lose its convection and degenerate into a tropical low shortly before making landfall in Papua New Guinea. After that, Ex-Tropical Cyclone Pierre entered the northern part of the Coral Sea and threatened to produce heavy rainfall and thunderstorms with damaging wind gusts across Cape York Peninsula.

=== Other systems ===
During 25 March, TCWC Brisbane started monitoring a tropical low that was located about 390 km (240 mi) to the south-west of Honiara in the Solomon Islands. Over the next day the system moved south-eastwards in an area of low vertical wind shear and moved into the South Pacific basin where the Fiji Meteorological Service started monitoring it as Tropical Depression 13F.

== Storm names ==
TCWC Perth

- Isobel
- Jacob
- Kara

TCWC Darwin

- George

TCWC Brisbane

- Nelson
- Odette
- Pierre

== Season effects ==
Name	Dates	Peak intensity			Areas affected	Damage (USD)	Deaths	Ref(s).
Name	Dates	Category	Wind speed	Pressure	Areas affected	Damage (USD)	Deaths	Ref(s).
Isobel	30 December – 5 January	Tropical low	55 km/h (35 mph)	992 hPa (29.29 inHg)	None	None	None	
Nelson	5 – 7 February	Category 2 tropical cyclone	95 km/h (60 mph)	985 hPa (29.09 inHg)	Northern Territory, Queensland	Unknown	Unknown	
Low	5 – 8 February	Tropical low	85 km/h (50 mph)	995 hPa (29.38 inHg)				
Odette	2 – 5 March	Tropical low	75 km/h (45 mph)	990 hPa (29.23 inHg)	None	None		
George	3 – 10 March	Category 5 severe tropical cyclone	205 km/h (125 mph)	902 hPa (26.64 inHg)	Western Australia	$15.7 million	5	
Jacob	3 – 12 March	Category 3 severe tropical cyclone	130 km/h (80 mph)	958 hPa (28.29 inHg)	Western Australia	Minimal		
Kara	23 – 30 March	Category 3 severe tropical cyclone	155 km/h (100 mph)	948 hPa (27.99 inHg)	None	None		
Pierre	15 – 23 May 2007	Category 1 tropical cyclone	75 km/h (45 mph)	990 hPa (29.23 inHg)	Solomon Islands, Papua New Guinea, Torres Straits	Unknown	Unknown	
Season aggregates
8 systems	30 December – 23 May		205 km/h (125 mph)	902 hPa (26.64 inHg)		$15.7 million	5	

== See also ==
- Tropical cyclones in 2006 and 2007
- List of Southern Hemisphere tropical cyclone seasons
- Atlantic hurricane seasons: 2006, 2007
- Pacific hurricane seasons: 2006, 2007
- Pacific typhoon seasons: 2006, 2007
- North Indian Ocean cyclone seasons: 2006, 2007
