= Cyclone Graham =

Category 1 Australian region cyclone in 2003

Tropical Cyclone Graham
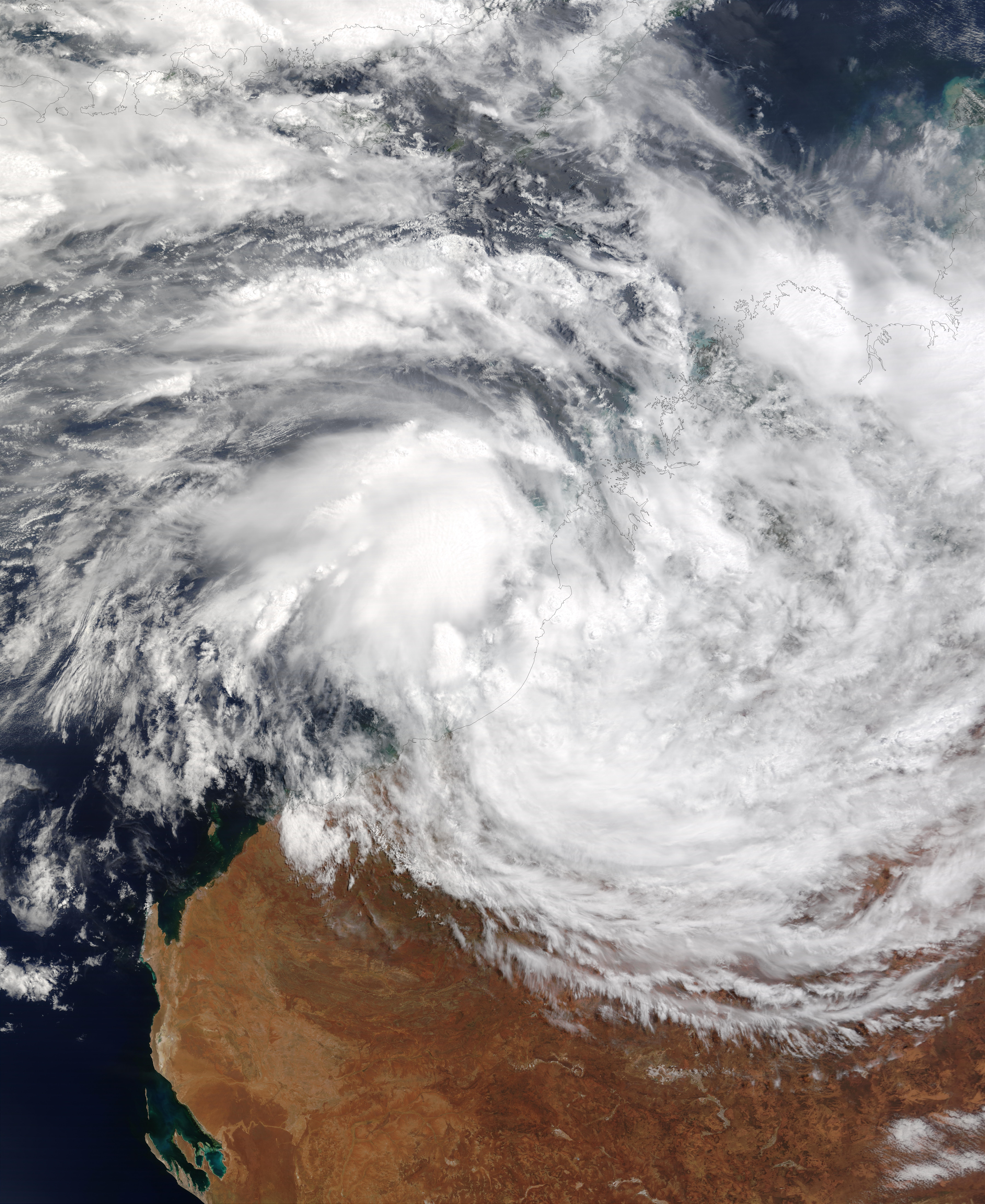
- Cyclone Graham on 28 February

Meteorological history
- Formed: 27 February 2003
- Dissipated: 1 March 2003

Category 1 tropical cyclone
- 10-minute sustained (Aus)
- Highest winds: 75 km/h (45 mph)
- Lowest pressure: 985 hPa (mbar); 29.09 inHg

Tropical storm
- 1-minute sustained (SSHWS/JTWC)
- Highest winds: 75 km/h (45 mph)
- Lowest pressure: 994 hPa (mbar); 29.35 inHg

Overall effects
- Fatalities: 1 total
- Areas affected: Western Australia
- IBTrACS
- Part of the 2002–03 Australian region cyclone season

Cyclone Graham of the 2002–03 Australian region cyclone season was a weak tropical storm that affected Australia during late February and early March 2003. Graham originated from an area of convection that emerged onto water after sitting over Australia on 23 February. The interaction with a monsoon trough formed an area of low pressure that developed into Tropical Cyclone Graham on 27 February. The storm moved slowly to the east-southeast, and after turning to the south it peaked as a tropical storm and made landfall on Western Australia the next day. The cyclone weakened as it moved inland, and dissipated on 1 March. The storm dropped heavy rainfall and caused high winds, which produced flooding and downed trees. One fatality occurred, though no significant damages were reported.

== Meteorological history ==
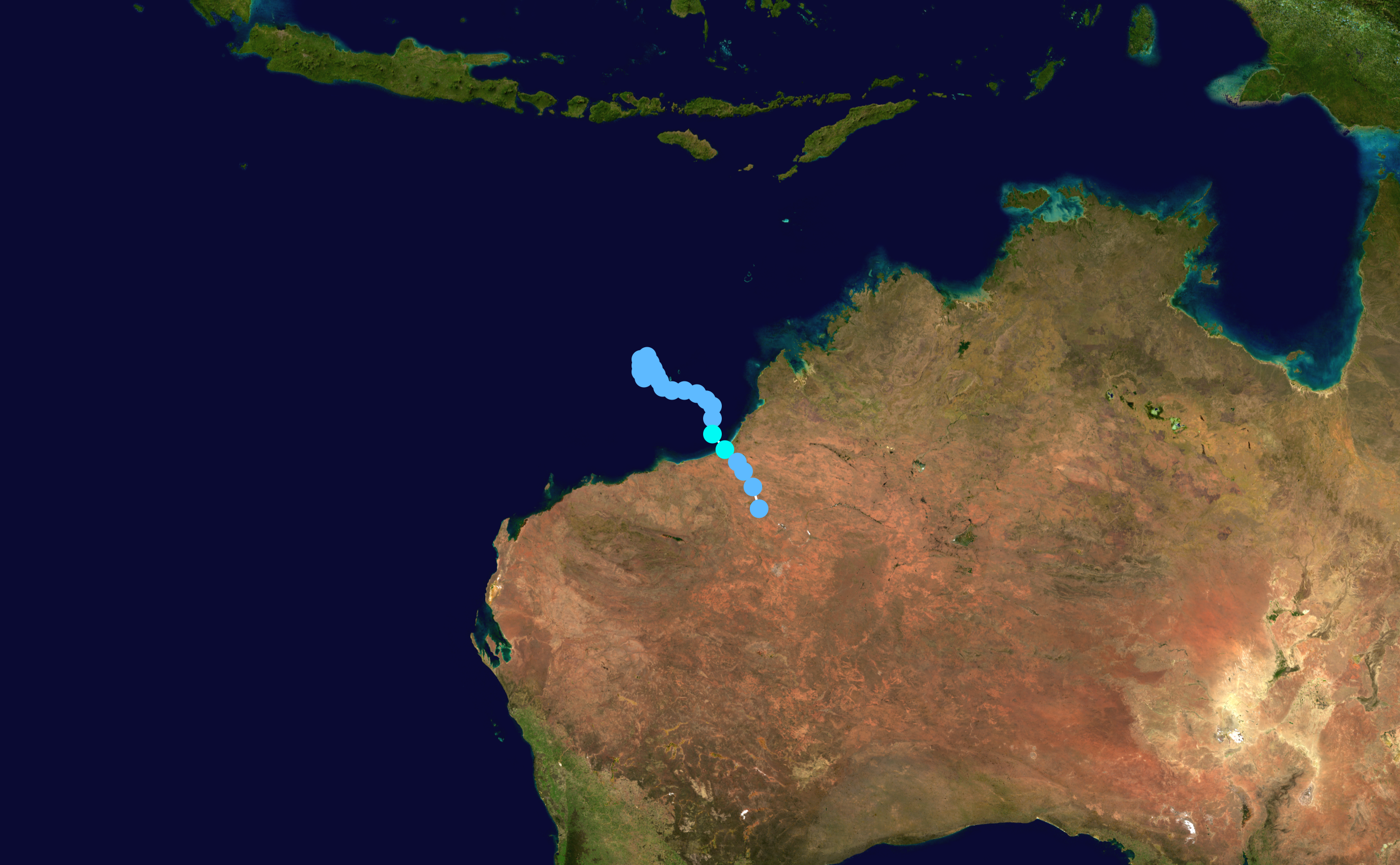
Map plotting the storm's track and intensity, according to the Saffir–Simpson scale Map key Saffir–Simpson scale Tropical depression (≤38 mph, ≤62 km/h) Tropical storm (39–73 mph, 63–118 km/h) Category 1 (74–95 mph, 119–153 km/h) Category 2 (96–110 mph, 154–177 km/h) Category 3 (111–129 mph, 178–208 km/h) Category 4 (130–156 mph, 209–251 km/h) Category 5 (≥157 mph, ≥252 km/h) Unknown Storm type Tropical cyclone Subtropical cyclone Extratropical cyclone, remnant low, tropical disturbance, or monsoon depression

On 23 February 2003, an area of convection that was situated over land for roughly a week emerged over open waters along the northern coast of Australia. The strengthening of a deep, persistent monsoon trough contributed to cyclogenesis, and a low pressure area formed. By 25 February, the low developed a banding feature in which the highest winds were located. Though the storm was located in an area of unfavorable wind shear, the Australian Bureau of Meteorology (BoM) began to issue gale warnings on the system at 0100 UTC the next day, while the low was located several hundred miles north-northeast of Port Hedland. The disturbance was initially nearly stationary as it showed signs of organization due to relaxed shear, and at 0700 UTC on 27 February, the Joint Typhoon Warning Center (JTWC) designated the storm as Tropical Cyclone Graham, as it had attained 80 km/h (50 mph) 10-minute maximum sustained winds. The first warning was issued on Graham later that day.

Initially exhibiting characteristics of a monsoonal low, a mid-level ridge to the south of Graham caused strong westerly winds that moved the storm slowly east-southeastward. However, a deep trough eroded the ridge, allowing the cyclone to move more towards the south. According to the JTWC, the storm had intensified late on 28 February, though at the same time the BoM noted the slight weakening of the storm. Graham reached its peak intensity that day while nearing the coast.

The storm made landfall at Western Australia's Eighty Mile Beach at 1400 UTC on 28 February, and began to weaken. The storm had dissipated on 1 March; the BoM issued their last advisory on the cyclone at 0400 UTC that day, while similarly, the JTWC issued their last advisory just two hours later. The storm's remnants died out in the country's desert.

== Impact ==
In advance of the cyclone, the communities of Wallal, Sandfire, Punmu and Telfer were put on alert. A warning was issued for Bidyadanga, Pardoo and Cotton Creek. The storm's landfall in Western Australia brought heavy rainfall and high winds. The storm dropped 163 mm (6.4 in) of rain at Telfer in one night, over half the town's annual average; total rainfall reached 175 mm (6.9 in) there. The heavy rain caused flooding and road closures, and swelled a river passing through Fitzroy Crossing, though the river only topped its banks slightly. Near that town, at Blue Bush Creek, while a group of people attempted to cross floodwaters, two men were swept away. Both men were rescued, though one died before emergency services arrived. In addition to the flooding, a number of trees were downed. No significant damages were reported.

Following the storm, the name Graham was retired from the Australian region basin.

== See also ==
- Tropical cyclones in 2003
- Weather of 2003
- Cyclone Inigo
