= 2002–03 Australian region cyclone season =

Cyclone season in the Australian region

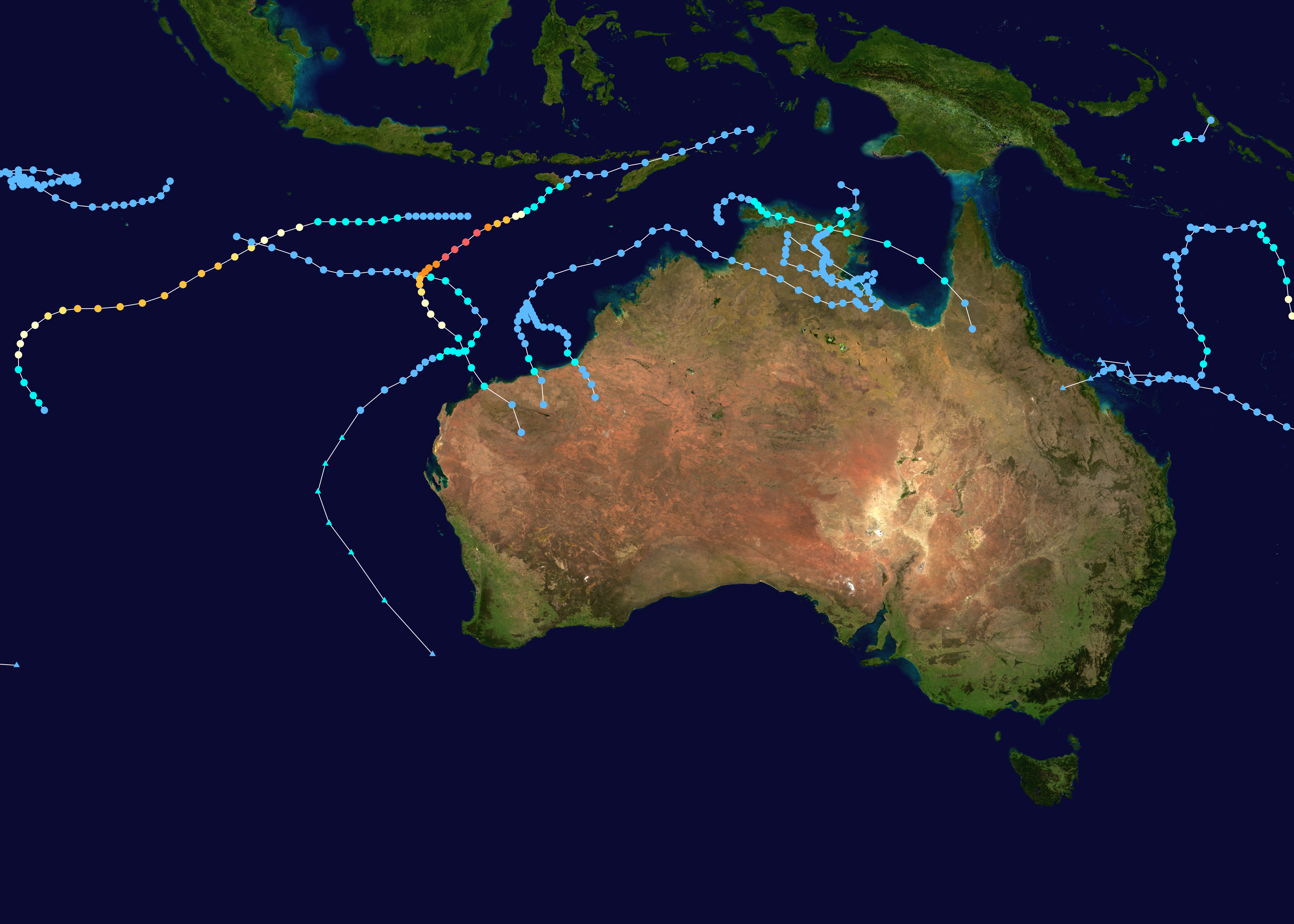
- Season summary map

Seasonal boundaries
- First system formed: 4 January 2003
- Last system dissipated: 6 June 2003

Strongest storm
- Name: Inigo (Most intense tropical cyclone in the Australian region on record, tied with Gwenda)
  - Maximum winds: 230 km/h (145 mph) (10-minute sustained)
  - Lowest pressure: 900 hPa (mbar)

Seasonal statistics
- Tropical lows: 10 official, 1 unofficial
- Tropical cyclones: 9
- Severe tropical cyclones: 3
- Total fatalities: 60
- Total damage: $12 million (2003 USD)

Related articles
- 2002–03 South-West Indian Ocean cyclone season; 2002–03 South Pacific cyclone season

The 2002–03 Australian region cyclone season included Cyclone Inigo, which tied with Cyclone Gwenda in 1999 as the most intense tropical cyclone on record in the Australian basin. It began on 1 November 2002 and ended on 30 April 2003. The regional tropical cyclone operational plan also defines a tropical cyclone year separately from a tropical cyclone season, which runs from 1 July 2002 to 30 June 2003. These dates conventionally delimit the period of each year when most tropical cyclones form in the Australian region, which is defined as in the southern hemisphere between 90°E and 180°E. The season's ten tropical depressions existed within these dates, with the first, designated as Tropical Cyclone 07S, entering the basin on 27 December 2002. The last system, Cyclone Epi, dissipated on 6 June 2003. Tropical cyclones in this area were monitored by four Tropical Cyclone Warning Centres (TCWCs): the Australian Bureau of Meteorology (BOM) in Perth, Darwin, and Brisbane and one in Port Moresby, Papua New Guinea.

Tropical cyclogenesis in the season began when a tropical low developed in the Arafura Sea on 5 January and last until 24 January, after meandering over northern and Western Australia. On 1 February, weakening Cyclone Beni entered the Australian region and brought severe flooding to Queensland, before dissipating on 5 February. Severe Tropical Cyclone Fiona formed north of Western Australia on 3 February and later peaked as a Category 4 severe tropical cyclone on the Australian tropical cyclone intensity scale. Cyclone Graham developed offshore Western Australia on 24 February and made landfall in a rural area of that state on 28 February, producing flooding in the area. Tropical Cyclone Harriet existed offshore of Western Australia from 1 to 11 March.

On 1 March, Cyclone Erica formed offshore Queensland and strengthened as it moved in a parabolic path, before leaving the Australian region on 12 March. Erica caused only minor damage in Queensland. Cyclone Craig originated offshore Northern Territory on 8 March. The system subsequently struck the territory and eventually made another landfall in Queensland on 12 March, after crossing the Gulf of Carpentaria. Impact from Craig was generally minor. Cyclone Inigo formed on 30 March and caused severe impact in Indonesia, especially in Flores, Sumba, and West Timor. Inigo later deepened into the most intense tropical cyclone on record in the Australian region, tied with Cyclone Gwenda in 1999. Inigo weakened significantly before striking Western Australia on 8 April and dissipating shortly thereafter. The final system, Tropical Cyclone Epi developed east of Papua New Guinea on 5 June and dissipated on the following day. Overall, the tropical cyclones of this season caused 60 deaths and about $12 million (2003 USD) (Note: All damage totals are in their respective currency values of 2003) in damage.

== Seasonal summary ==
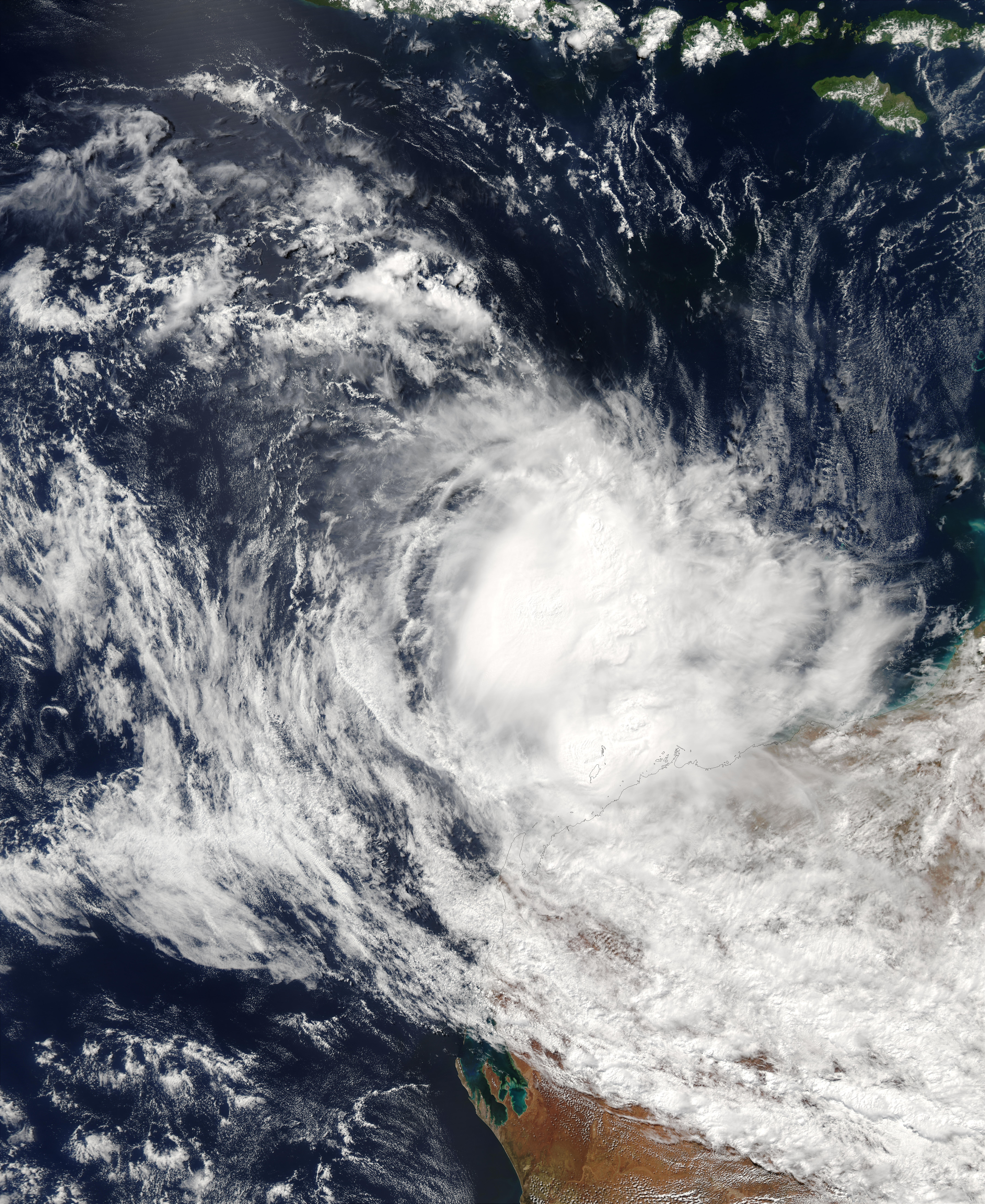
Inigo approaching western Australia on 7 April

The season began on 1 November 2002 and ended on 30 April 2003, while the regional tropical cyclone operational plan also defines a tropical cyclone year from 1 July 2002 to 30 June 2003. Eight cyclones entered or formed in the Australian region, which was below the 1970–71 to 2001–02 average of 13 per season. There was a major shift in tropical cyclone activity from the Australian region to the South Pacific, because of a moderate El Niño event. Only two cyclones occurred between 125°E and 150°E, which is east of Australia, and six formed between 150°E and 160°E. All of the tropical cyclone developed during Madden–Julian oscillation (MJO) pulses or Equatorial Rossby (ER) pulses. Overall, the tropical cyclones of this season resulted in 60 deaths and slightly less than $12 million in damage.

Activity began in December 2002, when Tropical Cyclone 07S entered the Australian region from the southwestern Indian Ocean basin on 27 December. In January, an unnamed tropical cyclone existed for more than three weeks over the Arafura Sea, Northern Territory, and Western Australia. The basin became more active in February, with South Pacific Cyclone Beni entering the area on 1 February. This was followed by the development of Fiona on 3 February and Graham on 24 February; both formed north of Western Australia. Two tropical cyclones – Harriet and Erica – both originated on 1 March; the former developed northwest of Western Australia and the latter formed east of Queensland. About a week later, 8 March, Cyclone Craig developed near the coast of Northern Territory. The strongest tropical system of the season, Cyclone Inigo, originated over the Lesser Sunda Islands of Indonesia on 30 March. At peak intensity, Inigo had a minimum barometric pressure of 900 mbar (27 inHg), making the most intense tropical cyclone in the Australian region on record, tied with Cyclone Gwenda in 1999. Activity remained dormant until the development of Cyclone Epi on 5 June, which dissipated on the following day.

== Systems ==
=== Tropical Cyclone 01U ===
- Category 2 tropical cyclone (Australian scale)
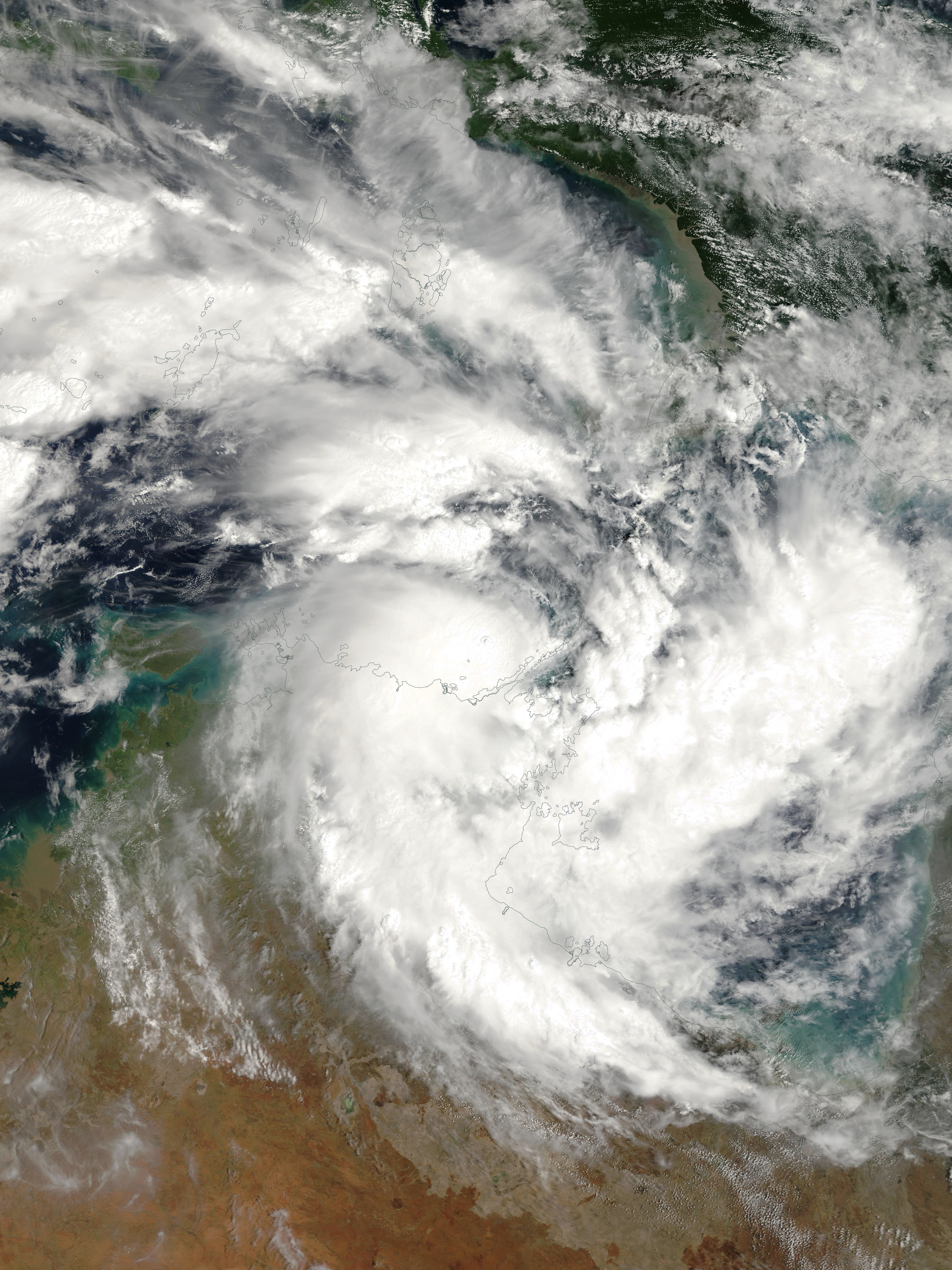
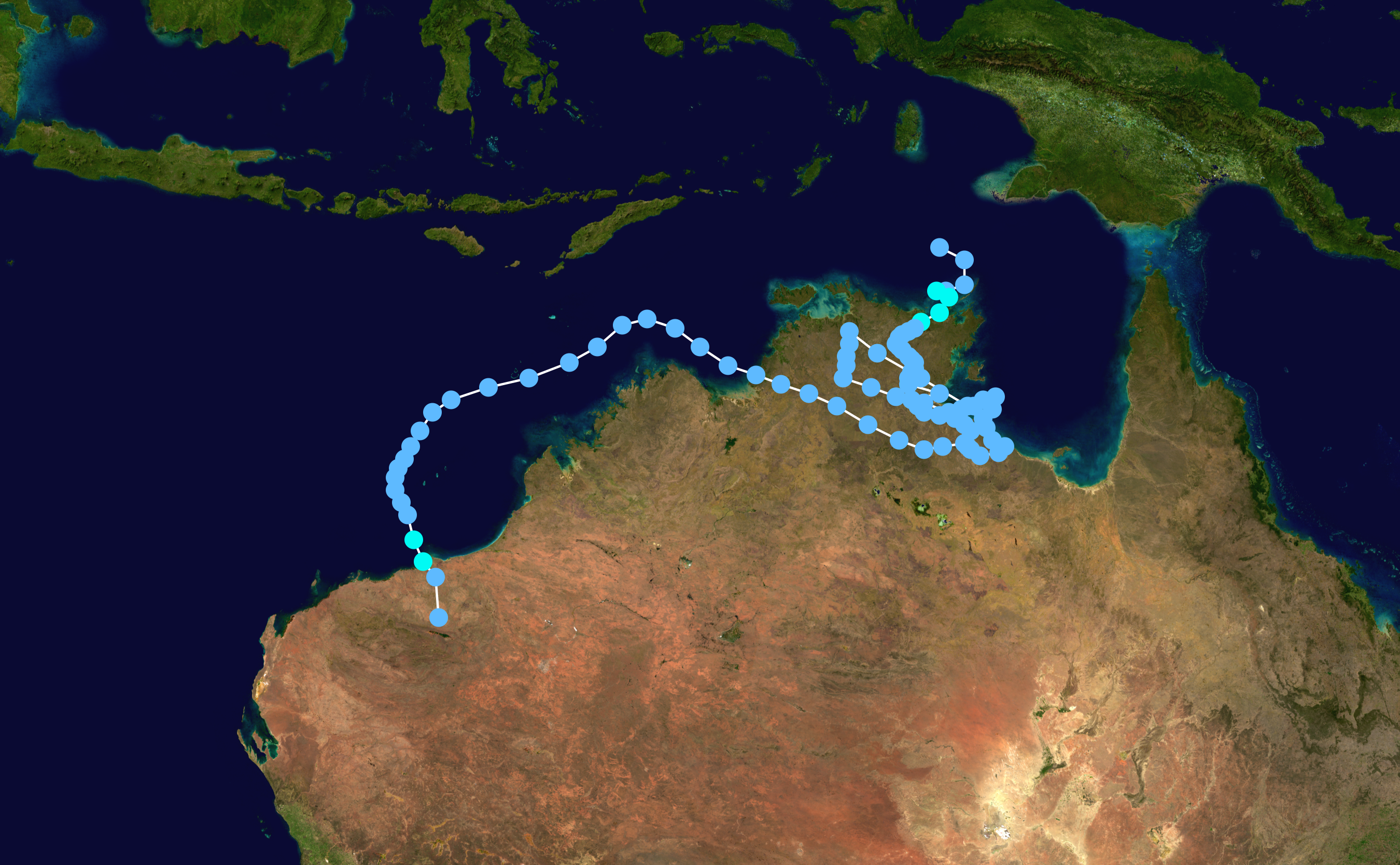
- Duration: 4 January – 25 January
- Peak intensity: 95 km/h (60 mph) (10-min); 988 hPa (mbar)

A tropical low developed over the Arafura Sea on 4 January and strengthened into a tropical cyclone before passing near Elcho Island, Northern Territory. The storm then made landfall in Arnhem Land on 5 January. At 09:00 UTC, the system peaked with winds of 95 km/h (59 mph). It meandered over Northern Territory and the Gulf of Carpentaria for a few weeks. The system remained inland until moving offshore Kimberley on 21 January. A deep trough generated wind shear, which inhibited significant intensification. However, deep convection began to develop late on 24 January as it approached the north coast of Western Australia. Around 0300 UTC on 25 January, the storm made landfall near Port Hedland with winds of 65 km/h (40 mph). The system quickly weakened and dissipated by 12:00 UTC.

Gale-force winds caused damage vegetation, trees, vehicles, and buildings in Elcho Island, Gapuwiyak, Maningrida, and Ramingining. Wind-driven waves at the mouth of the Rose River inundated workshops near Numbulwar. Torrential rains fell in the Roper–McArthur River district, peaking at 880 mm (35 in) at Wollogorang. A temporary evacuation occurred along the Waterhouse River at Beswick. Other rivers that overflowed inundated portions of highways such as the Carpentaria Highway and Tablelands Highway. After regenerating into a tropical cyclone, the storm brought up to 146.6 mm (5.77 in) of rainfall in a 24-hour period in the Port Hedland area. This caused the Yule River to overflow its banks, which flooded the North-West Highway. Operationally, the storm was thought to have been two separate systems and to have remained below tropical cyclone intensity.

=== Tropical Cyclone Beni ===
- Category 1 tropical cyclone (Australian scale)
- Tropical depression (SSHWS)
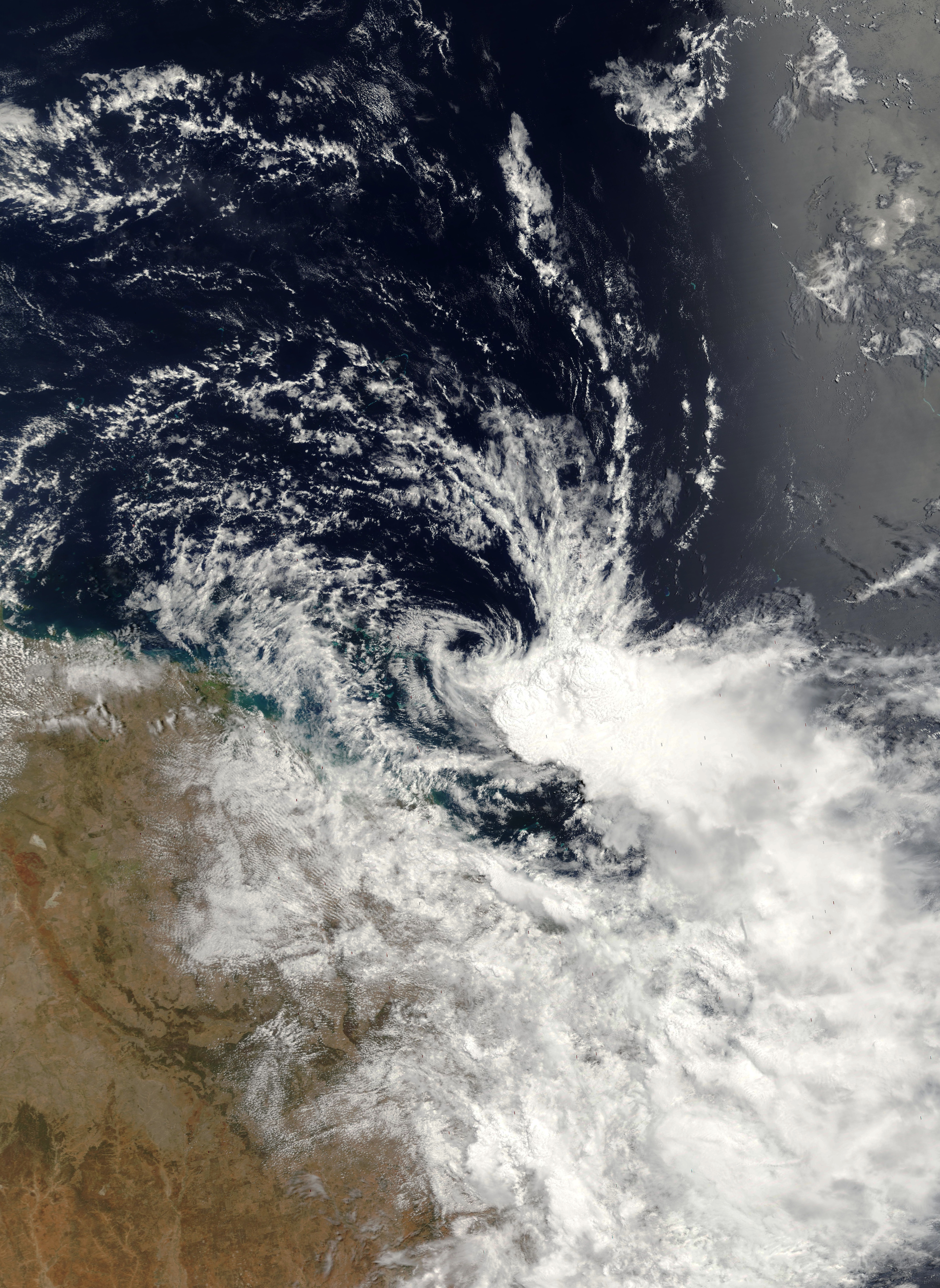
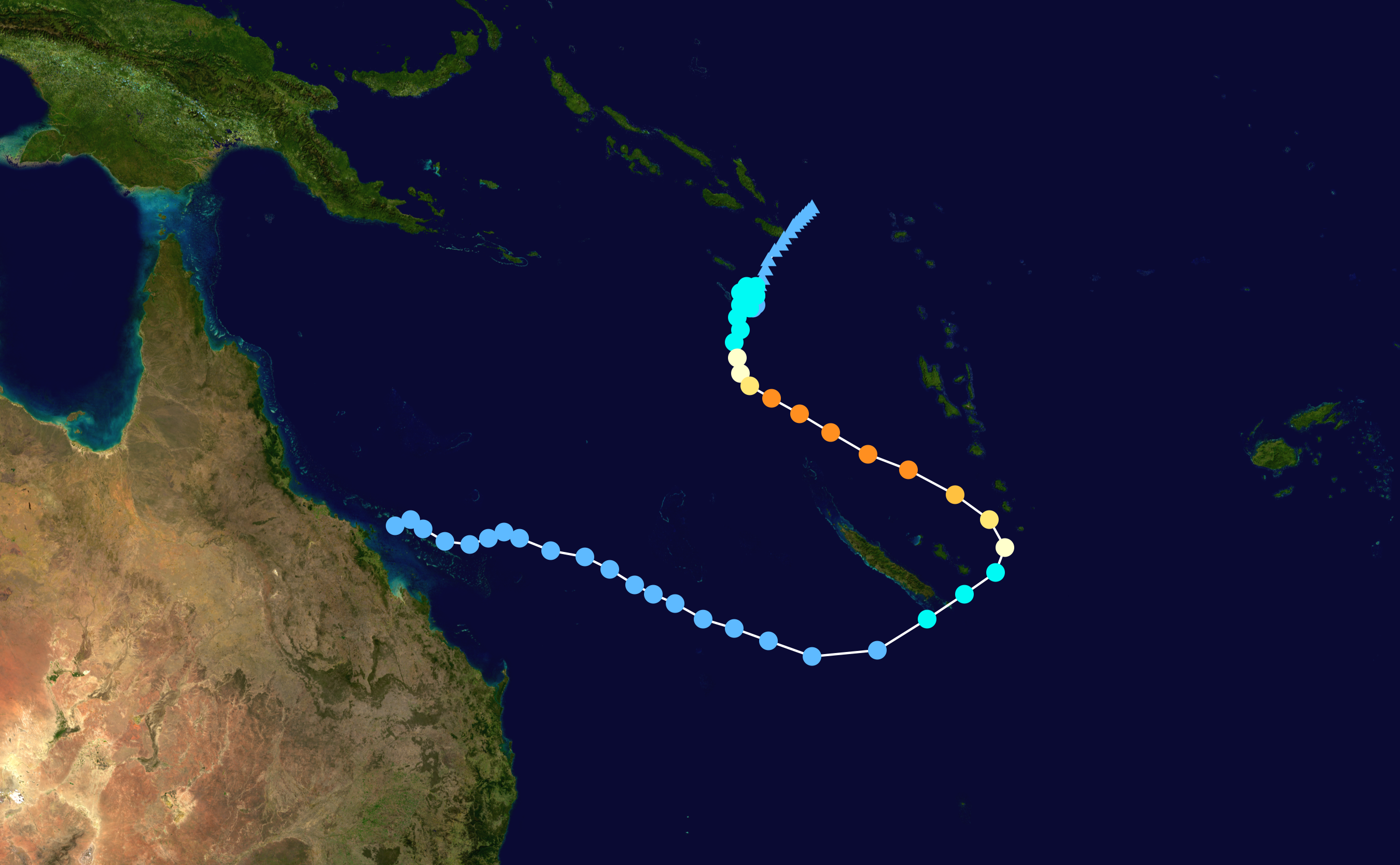
- Duration: 1 February (Entered basin) – 5 February
- Peak intensity: 65 km/h (40 mph) (10-min); 995 hPa (mbar)

Beni originated from the South Pacific region in late January and its remnants crossed into the Australian region by 1 February. Upon reaching the Coral Sea, the remnants of Beni slowly began to redevelop. After strong convective bands formed, Brisbane TCWC initiated gale warnings. Located offshore Queensland on 4 February, the remnants of Beni regenerated into a tropical cyclone. However, strong vertical wind shear caused Beni to dissipated on 5 February, while situated offshore of Queensland near the city of Mackay.

Heavy rainfall accompanied Beni and its remnants, reaching 500 mm (20 in) near Gladstone. One person drowned due to the flooding rains. Runoff on the Fitzroy River caused by Cyclone Beni resulted in a moderate flood with an estimated return period of four years at Rockhampton. The cyclone's heavy rains helped ease drought problems in Queensland. Nine shires in Central Queensland were declared disaster areas. Additionally, strong winds left power outages in Agnes Water and 1770. Overall, Beni resulted in damages of at least A$10 million (US$6 million) in Queensland.

=== Tropical Low Isha ===
- Tropical low (Australian scale)
- Tropical depression (SSHWS)
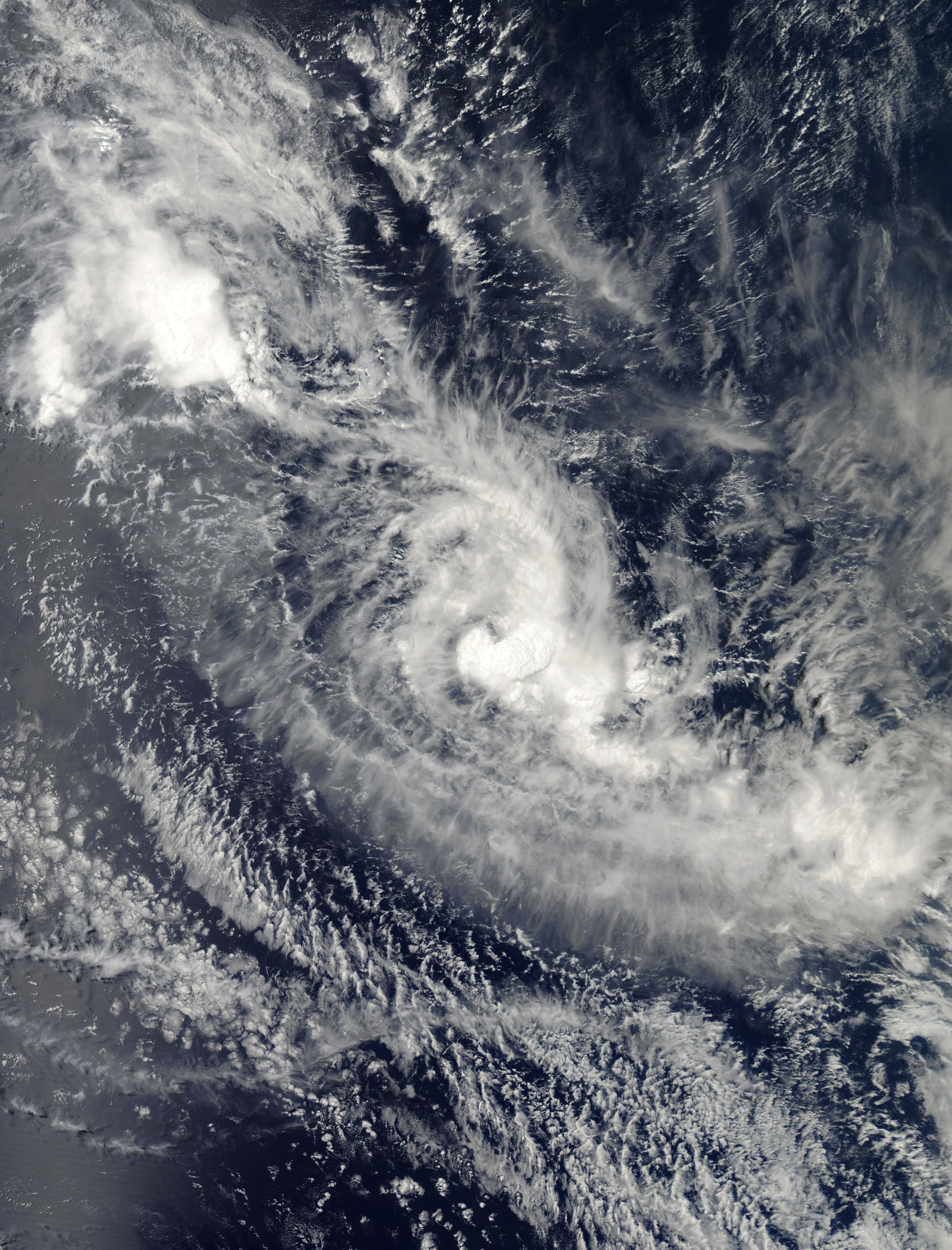
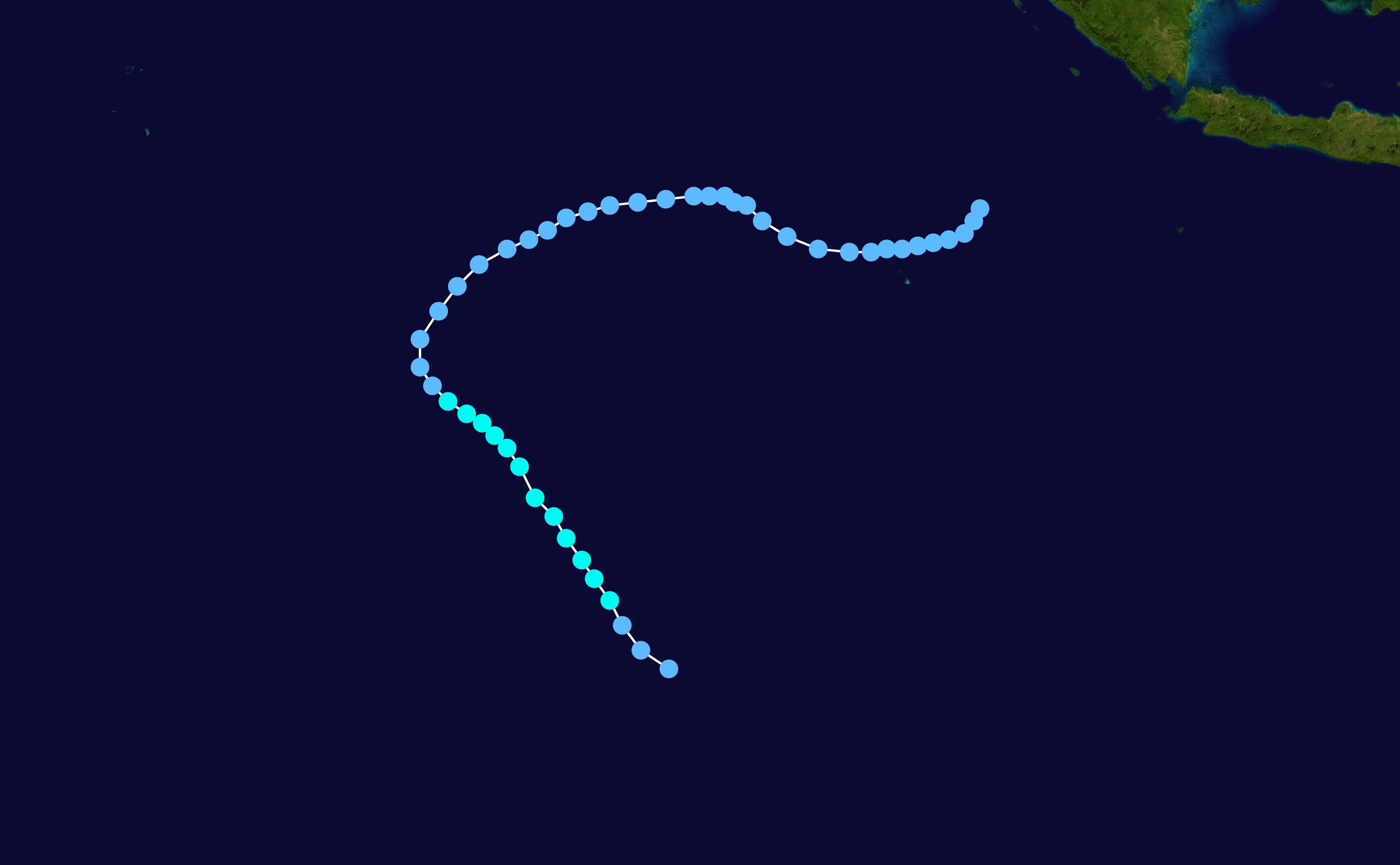
- Duration: 3 February – 8 February (exited basin)
- Peak intensity: 55 km/h (35 mph) (10-min); 1002 hPa (mbar)

Although the origins of system are not entirely certain, widespread convection in the monsoon trough persisted across the south-eastern Indian Ocean in early February. One area was tracked by the Joint Typhoon Warning Center (JTWC) on 3 February in the Australian basin, south-west of Indonesia. Between 4 February and 6 February, TCWC Perth issued gale warnings as the low passed near the Cocos Islands. The system moved westward without development, with sustained winds not exceeding 55 km/h (35 mph), and crossed into the southwest Indian Ocean basin on 8 February.

=== Severe Tropical Cyclone Fiona ===
- Category 4 severe tropical cyclone (Australian scale)
- Category 3 tropical cyclone (SSHWS)
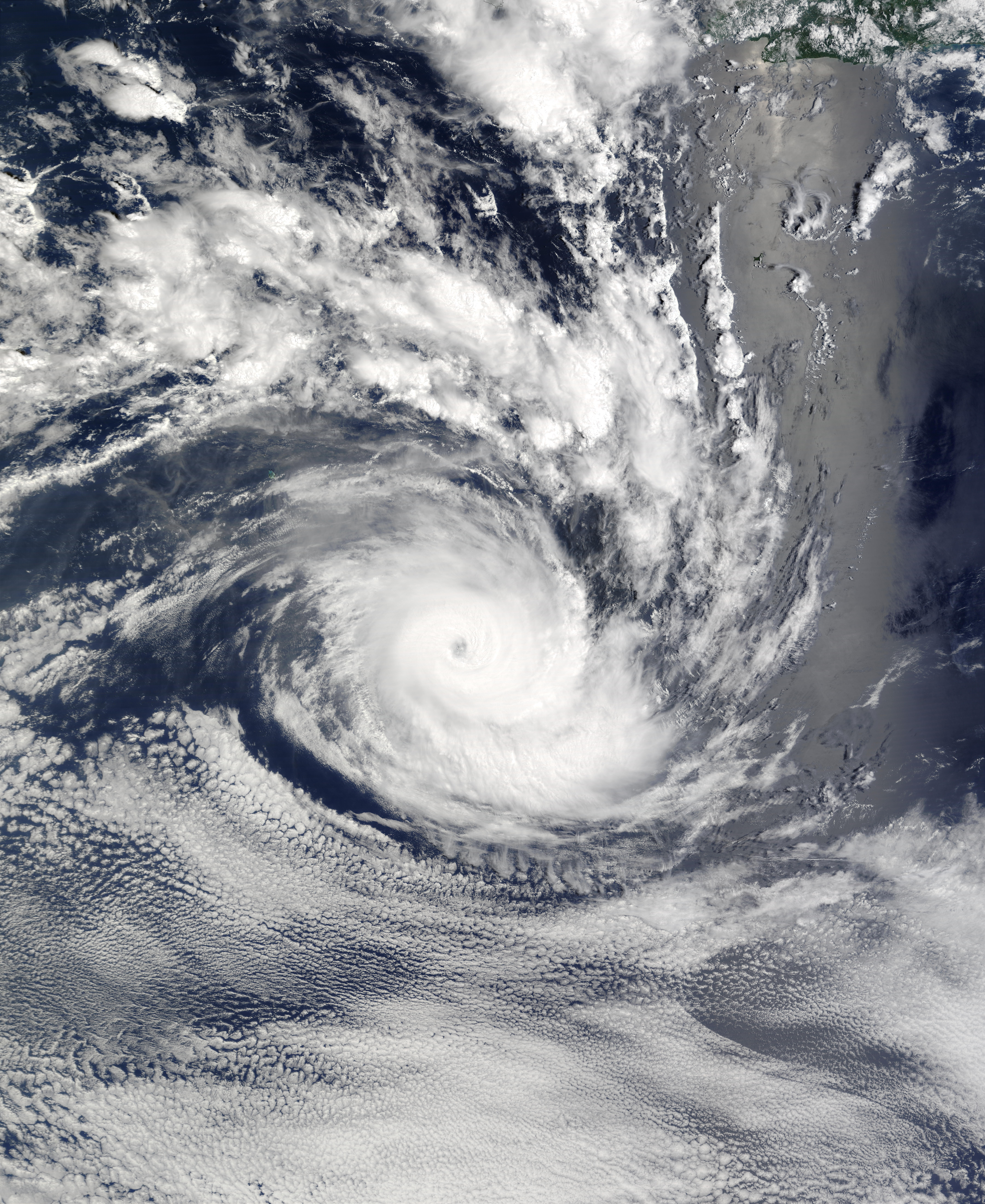
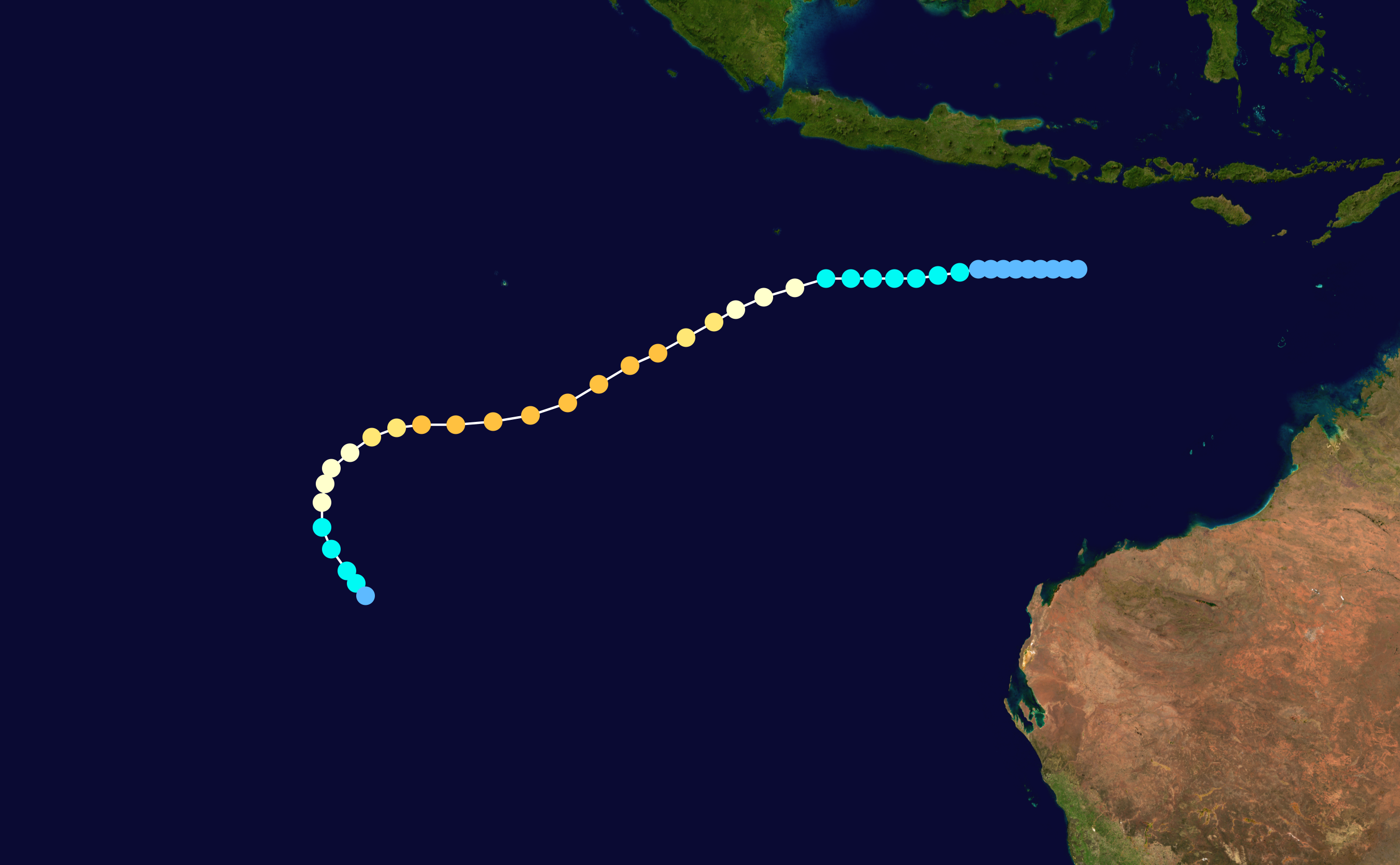
- Duration: 3 February – 13 February
- Peak intensity: 175 km/h (110 mph) (10-min); 935 hPa (mbar)

An area of convection began developing into a tropical low on 3 February, while located about 970 km (600 mi) north of Karratha, Western Australia. Poorly-defined convection was noted as well as good outflow and a weak circulation. The system drifted westward with minimal development until late on 4 February, when satellite imagery showed increasing convection near the center. Subsequently, the JTWC issued a TCFA for the system. With the developing low located in an environment of weak to moderate wind shear, TCWC Perth issued a warning. At 0700 UTC on 5 February, Perth named the system Fiona. The JTWC issued their first advisory on Fiona about five hours later. Fiona strengthened steadily and reached tropical cyclone intensity at 0600 UTC on 6 February. Continuing to intensify, TCWC Perth upgraded the storm to severe tropical cyclone status early on 7 February.

Early on 8 February, an eye became embedded within partial concentric convective bands. Later that day, TCWC Perth reported a peak intensity of 175 km/h (109 mph) at 1000 UTC. Shortly thereafter, the storm began weakening as dry air increased. By 1000 UTC on 9 February, TCWC Perth reduced the intensity of Fiona to 170 km/h (110 mph). Deep convection weakened somewhat and the eye had become cloud-filled. Although the eye briefly redeveloped, water vapor imagery showed cooler and drier air entering the southern portion of the storm. Fiona began to turn southwestward as it neared the 90°E longitude. By late 12 February, Fiona weakened below gale force intensity. Moving steadily southward, it then re-curved south-southeastward along the 91°E. With the storm rapidly weakening, JTWC issued their final warning early on 13 February and Perth followed suit four hours later. The remnants of Fiona moved into the Great Australian Bight, leading to significant amounts of rainfall. The Eyre Peninsula and Adelaide recorded more rain in 24 hours than they had in 2002 and 2001 combined. The New South Wales saw major flooding events in towns such as Tamworth. Flooding also closed the Pacific Highway. Over 100 houses along the Gold Coast were damaged due to the torrential rains.

=== Tropical Cyclone Graham ===
- Category 1 tropical cyclone (Australian scale)
- Tropical storm (SSHWS)
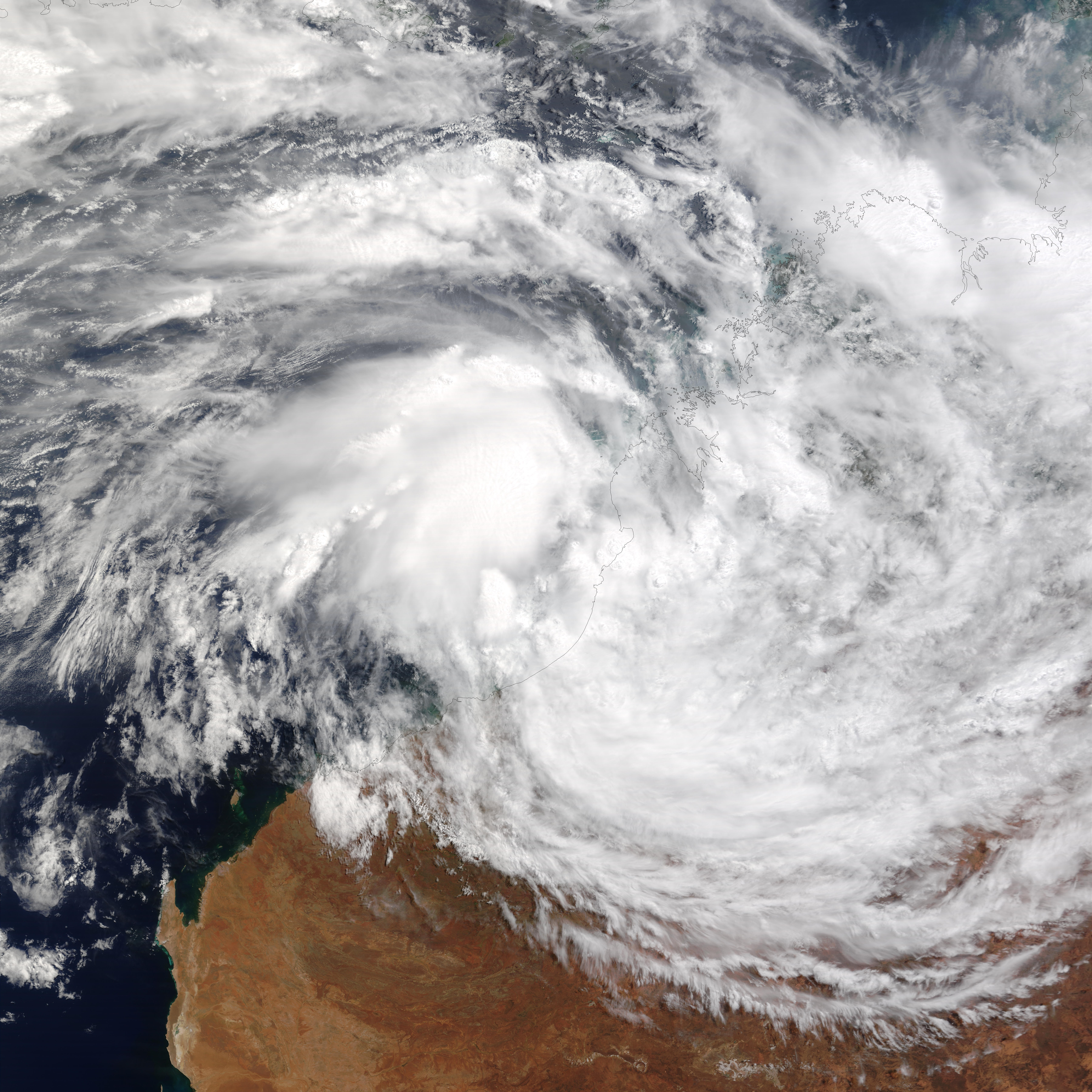
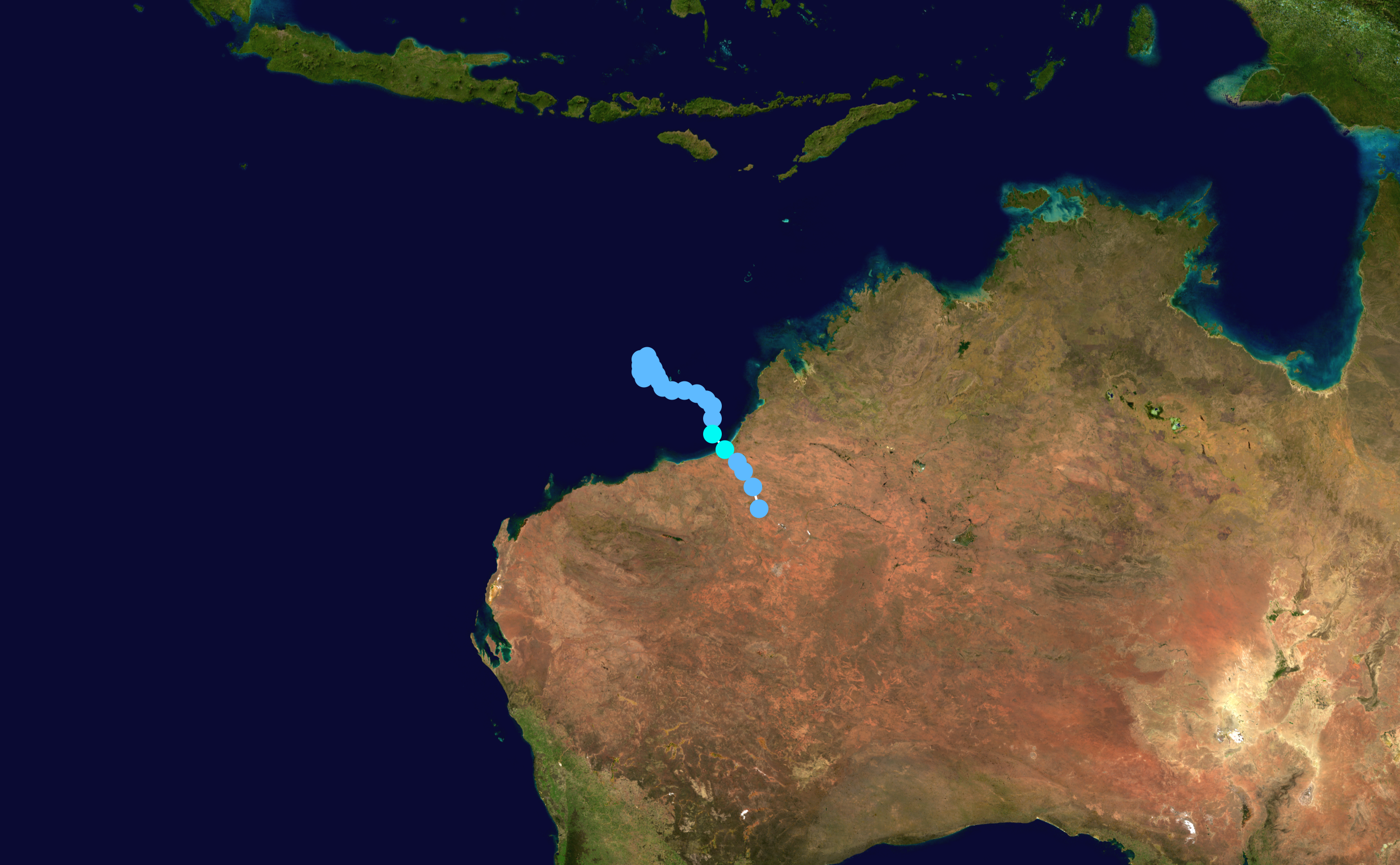
- Duration: 24 February – 1 March
- Peak intensity: 75 km/h (45 mph) (10-min); 985 hPa (mbar)

In late February, an area of convection situated inland for roughly a week emerged over open waters along the northern coast of Australia. A tropical low formed on 24 February, and developed a banding feature by 25 February. Despite strong wind shear, the BOM began issuing warnings while the low was located several hundred kilometers north-northeast of Port Hedland. The disturbance was initially nearly stationary. At 0700 UTC on 27 February, the JTWC designated the storm as Tropical Cyclone Graham. According to the JTWC, the storm had intensified late on 28 February, though the BOM noted the slight weakening of the storm. Graham reached its peak intensity that day with winds of 95 km/h (59 mph), while nearing the coast. The storm made landfall at Eighty Mile Beach, Western Australia at 1400 UTC on 28 February. Graham weakened and dissipated on 1 March.

The storm dropped rainfall in Western Australia, with 175 mm (6.9 in) recorded at Telfer. The heavy rain caused flooding and road closures, and swelled a river passing through Fitzroy Crossing, though the river only topped its banks slightly. In nearby Blue Bush Creek, two men drowned as their group of people attempted to cross floodwaters. Both men were rescued, though one died before emergency services arrived. In addition to the flooding, a number of trees were downed.

=== Tropical Cyclone Harriet ===
- Category 1 tropical cyclone (Australian scale)
- Tropical storm (SSHWS)
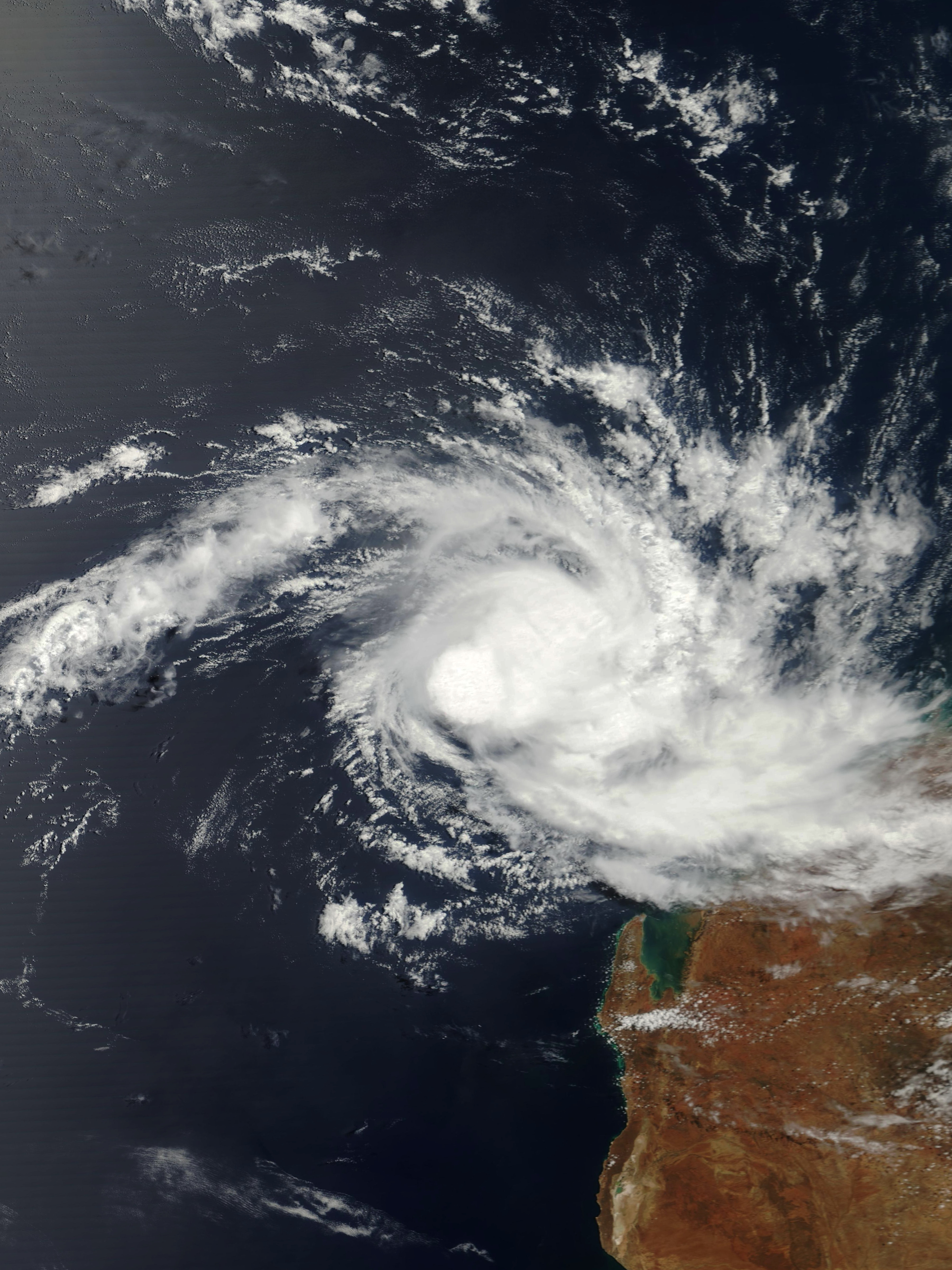
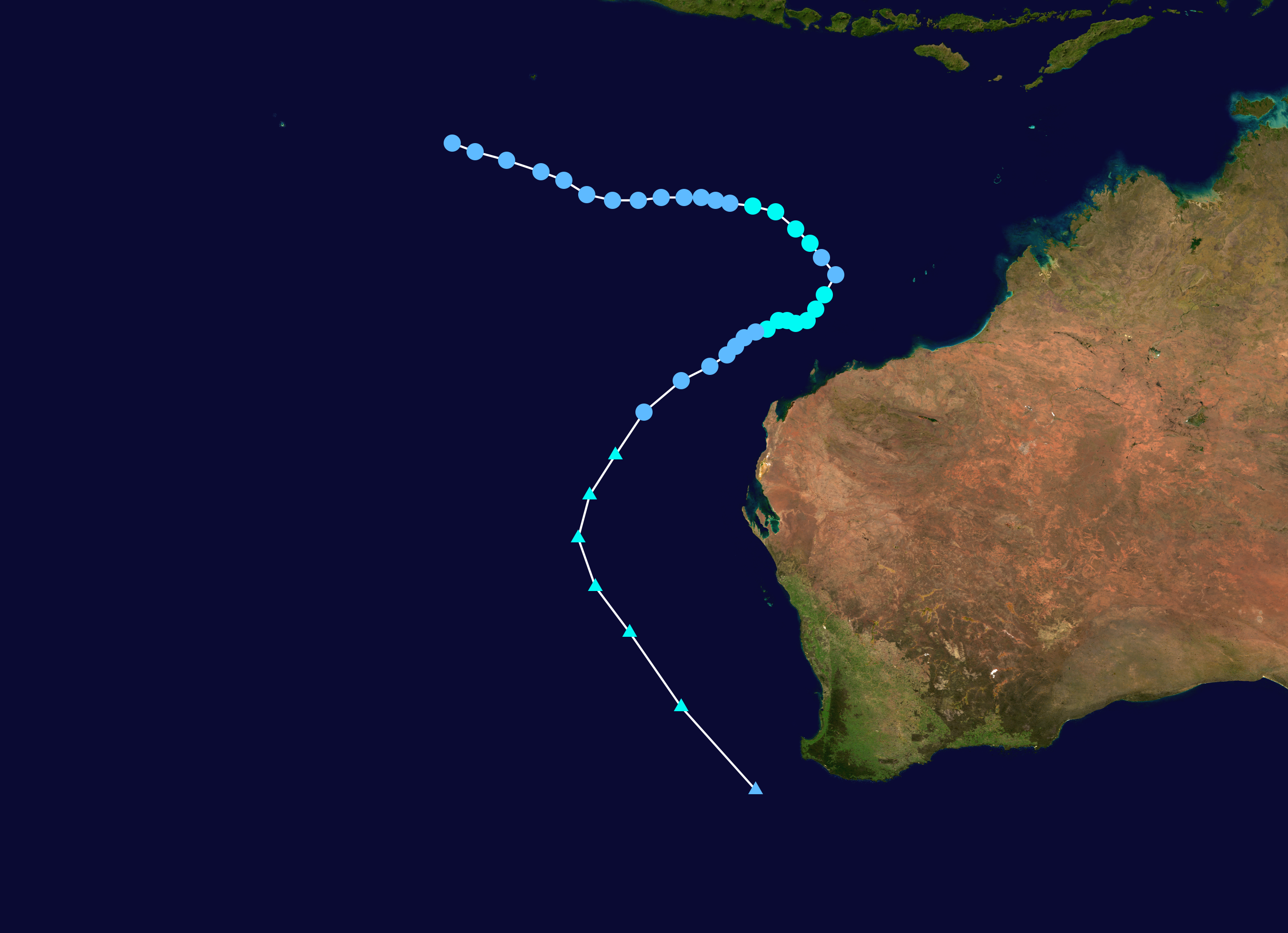
- Duration: 1 March – 11 March
- Peak intensity: 85 km/h (50 mph) (10-min); 985 hPa (mbar)

A tropical low developed southwest of Christmas Island on 28 February. Perth TCWC issued a TWO on 1 March, which indicated an eastward-moving 1,005 mb (29.7 inHg) low. At 0600 UTC on 2 March, the JTWC initiated warnings on Tropical Cyclone 21S, estimating winds of 65 km/h (40 mph). The system maintained a well-defined circulation, although deep convection diminished somewhat on 2 March. Later that day, Perth began issuing gale warnings on the low as it was expected to develop into a tropical cyclone. Moving eastward, convection increased near the center, though dry air inhibited much development. At 0400 UTC on 4 March, the TCWC Perth named the system Tropical Cyclone Harriet.

On 5 March, JTWC briefly decreased the intensity of Harriett to 55 km/h (34 mph), as deep convection diminished, probably due to persistent dry air. By late on 5 March, convection increased in coverage. Based on this, TCWC Perth upped their intensity to 80 km/h (50 mph). Late on 5 March, Harriet moved slowly southward and curved west-southwestward. Although convection fluctuated, the cyclone maintained its intensity. After deep convection decreased slightly, the JTWC lowered the intensity of Harriett to 65 km/h (40 mph). However, TCWC Perth suggested otherwise and on 8 March, Harriet peaked with winds of 100 km/h (62 mph), while located over 480 km (300 mi) north-northwest of Carnarvon. Early on 9 March, JTWC issued their final advisory on Harriet. The storm became extratropical at 1000 UTC on 9 March, while located about 580 km (360 mi) west-northwest of Carnarvon. Strong winds from Harriet contributed to a large bushfire near Walpole, Western Australia.

=== Severe Tropical Cyclone Erica ===
- Category 3 severe tropical cyclone (Australian scale)
- Category 1 tropical cyclone (SSHWS)
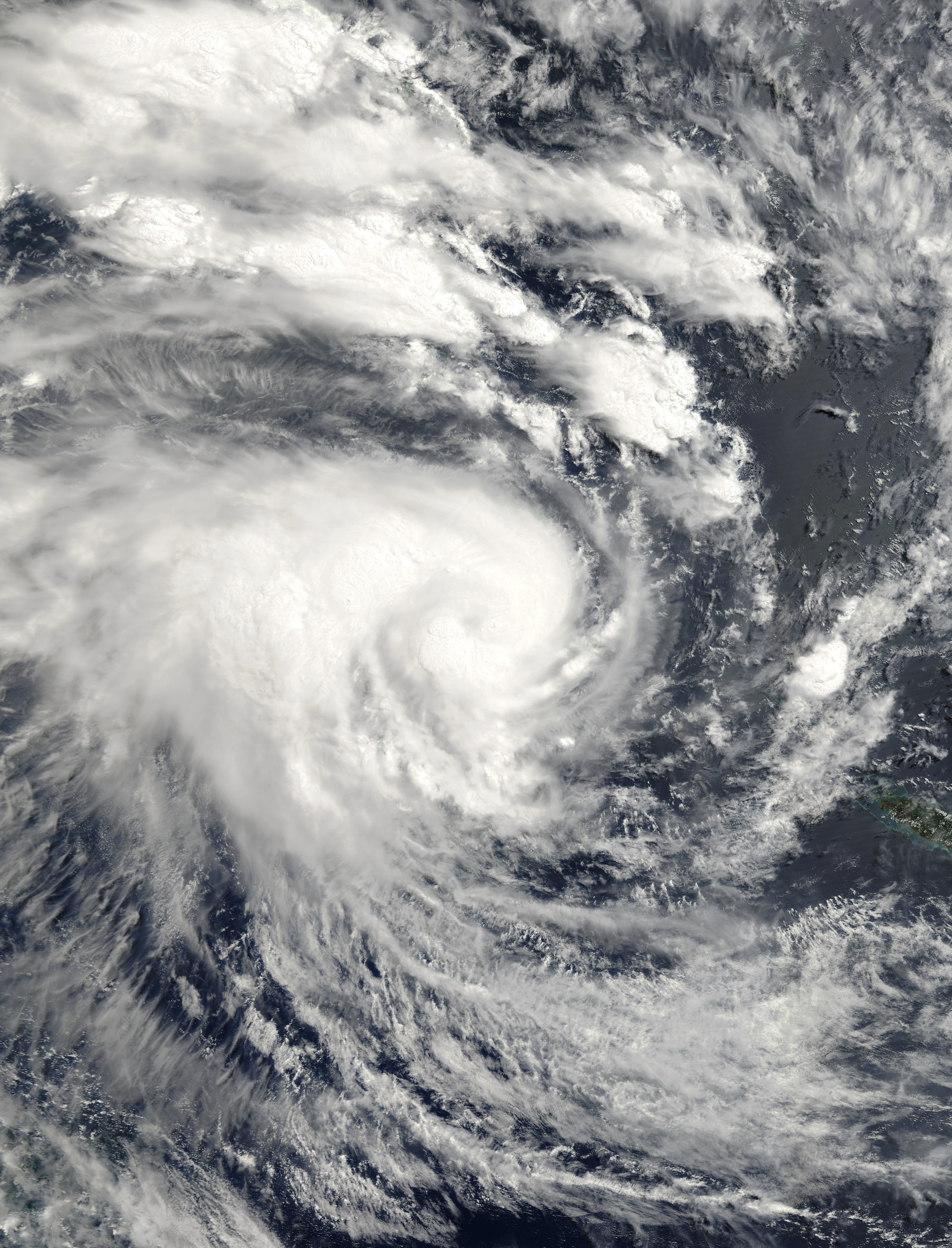
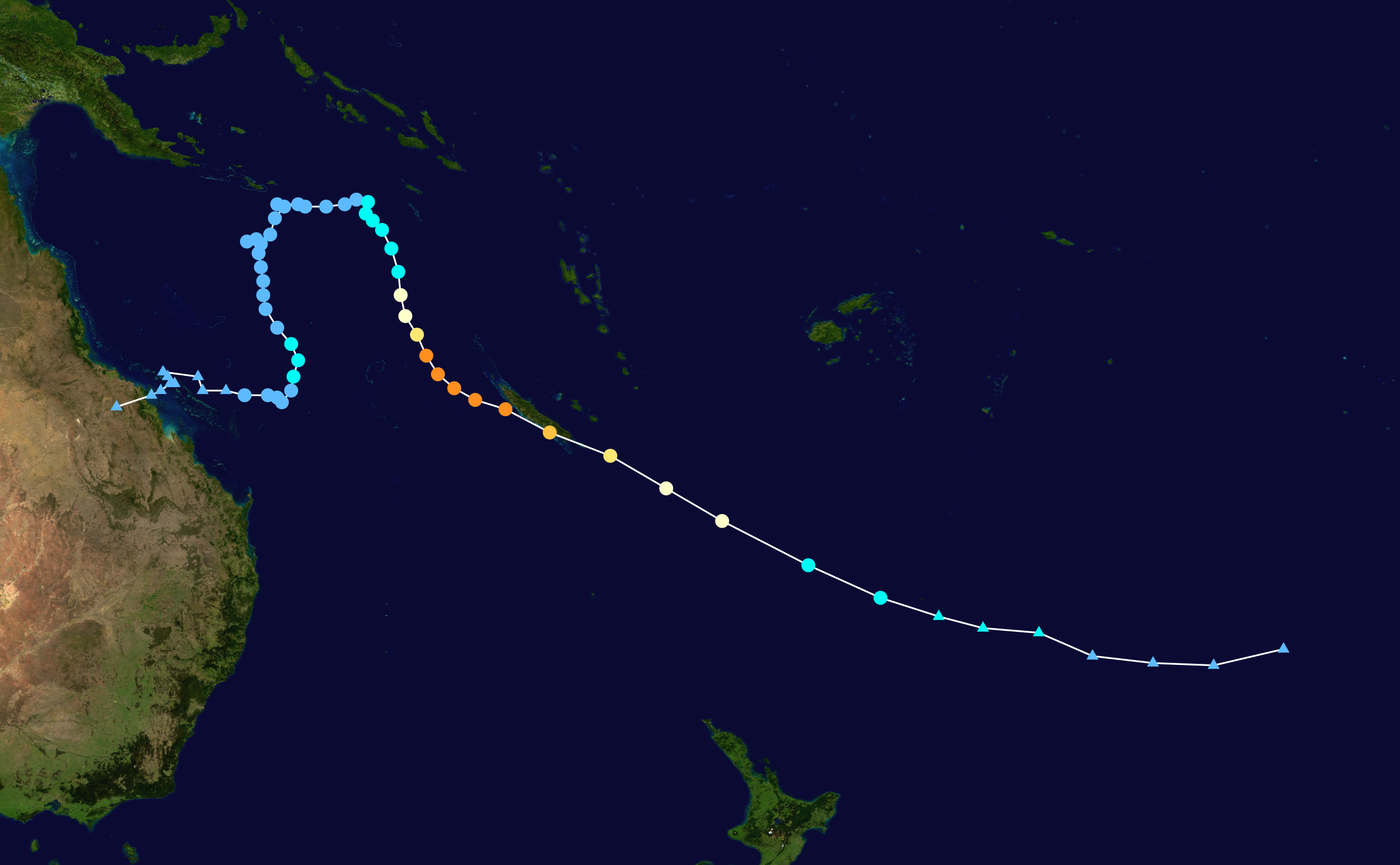
- Duration: 1 March – 12 March (Exited basin)
- Peak intensity: 150 km/h (90 mph) (10-min); 960 hPa (mbar)

A monsoon trough strengthened into a tropical low on 1 March. The low then significantly organized and was named Erica on 4 March, just offshore Queensland. Early on 5 March, the JTWC began classifying the system as Tropical Cyclone 22S. Moving slowly southeastward and then northward under the influence of a weak mid-level ridge to the east, Erica attained 10-minute sustained winds of 150 km/h (93 mph). However, Erica soon weakened due to strong wind shear. On 7 March, the cyclone degenerated into a tropical low. After the remnants curved eastward and then southeastward, wind shear abated and became favorable for tropical cyclogenesis. As a result, the low regenerated into a tropical cyclone. After attaining the equivalent to a Category 1 hurricane on the Saffir–Simpson hurricane wind scale, Erica entered the South Pacific basin on 12 March.

Severe Tropical Cyclone Erica was a powerful cyclone that severely affected New Caledonia and was considered the worst to affect the country since Cyclone Beti in 1996. Early in its existence while just offshore Queensland, the predecessor to Erica brought strong winds to the coast. Several trees were uprooted, and others were defoliated. Power lines were also damaged.

=== Tropical Cyclone Craig ===
- Category 2 tropical cyclone (Australian scale)
- Tropical storm (SSHWS)
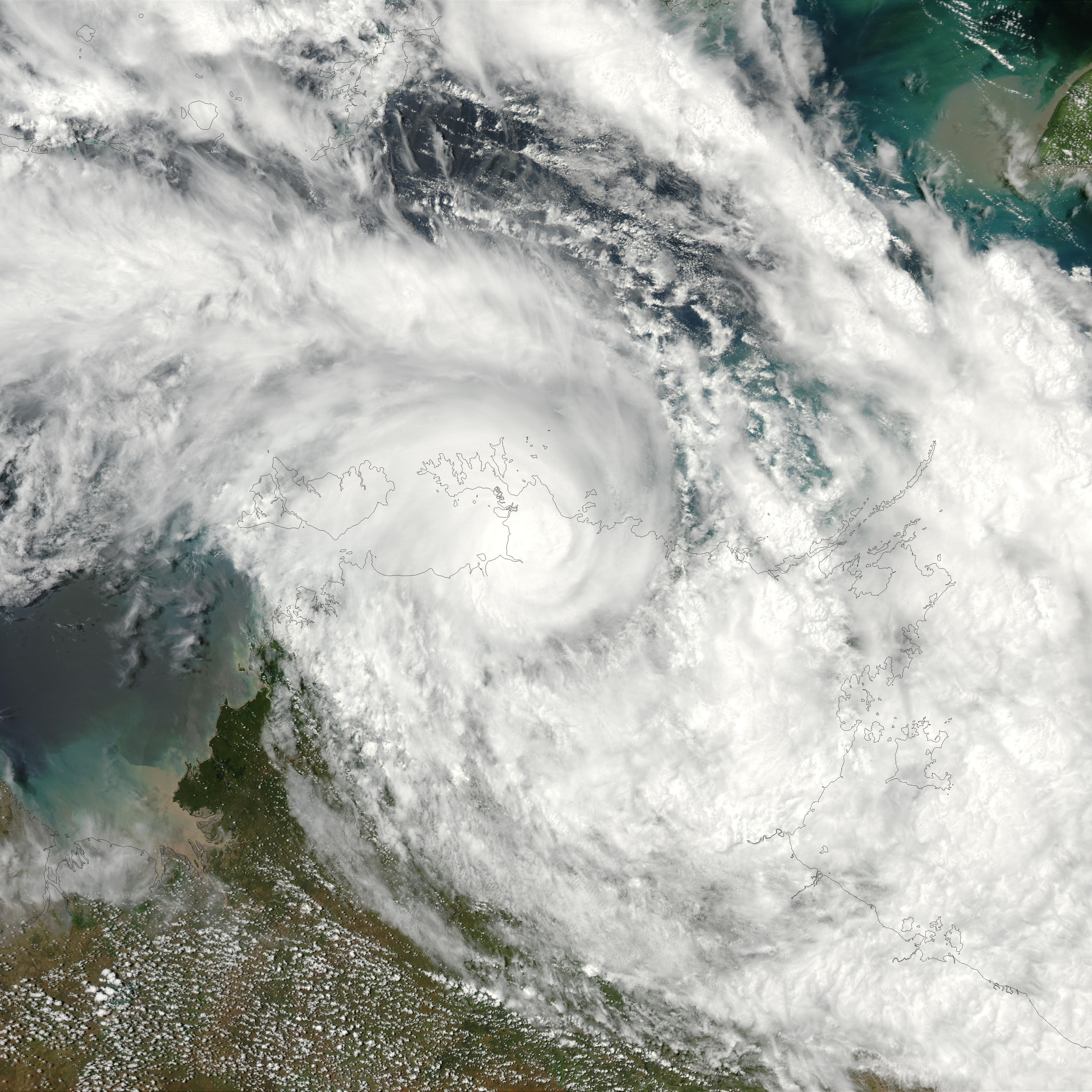
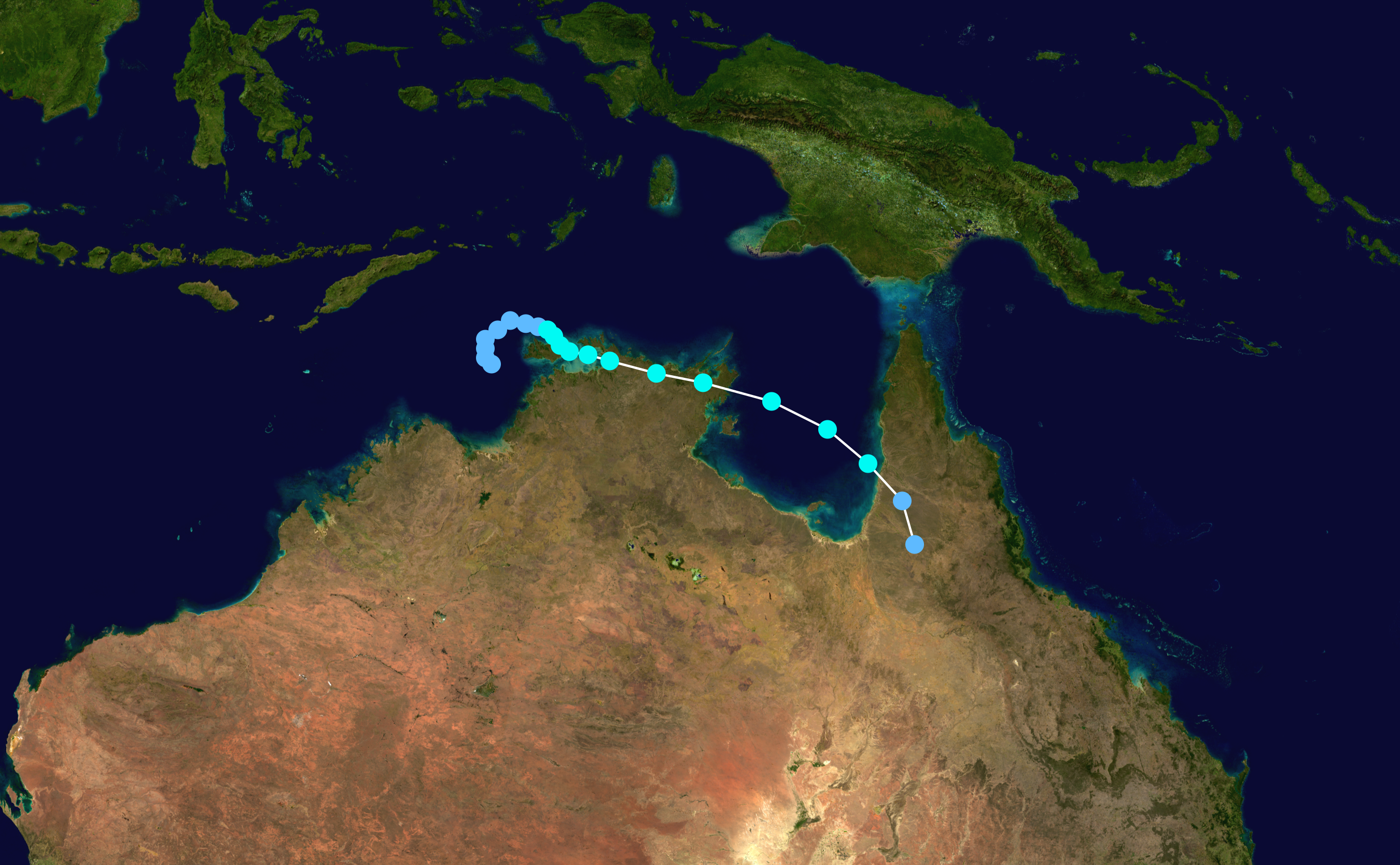
- Duration: 8 March – 13 March
- Peak intensity: 100 km/h (65 mph) (10-min); 976 hPa (mbar)

TCWC Darwin began monitoring a tropical low that developed west of Darwin on 5 March. Early on 8 March, the JTWC classified the system as Tropical Cyclone 24S. At 0300 UTC on 9 March, the storm became Tropical Cyclone Craig, while situated northwest of Cape Fourcroy. The storm deepened and drifted eastward and then southeastward. On 10 March, Craig made landfall on Melville Island with winds of 95 km/h (59 mph). Upon emerging into the Van Diemen Gulf on 10 March, Craig peaked with sustained winds of 100 km/h (62 mph). Craig struck the Coburg Peninsula and began to slowly weaken inland. The storm reached the Gulf of Carpentaria on 11 March, where it accelerated southeastward. On 12 March at 0600 UTC, the cyclone made landfall south of Kowanyama. After moving inland, the storm quickly weakened and dissipated later that day.

In advance of the storm, tropical cyclone advisories were issued for communities between Weipa and Mornington Island. The government of the Tiwi Islands evacuated some residents to shelters. In the Darwin area, certain schools were closed temporarily as a precaution. Impact from Craig was generally minor. At Ramingining, 164 mm (6.5 in) of rain fell in just 24 hours. Storm surge ran 2 to 2.5 m (6.6 to 8.2 ft) on Goulburn Island and the Cobourg Peninsula, while tides were estimated at 1.5 m (4.9 ft) at Nhulunbuy. Strong winds at Maningrida and Kowanyama downed numerous trees, with one striking a house in the latter. Craig inflicted minor damage to small craft in the northwestern Gulf of Carpentaria. Throughout the region, roads were cut by the cyclone.

=== Severe Tropical Cyclone Inigo ===
- Category 5 severe tropical cyclone (Australian scale)
- Category 5 tropical cyclone (SSHWS)
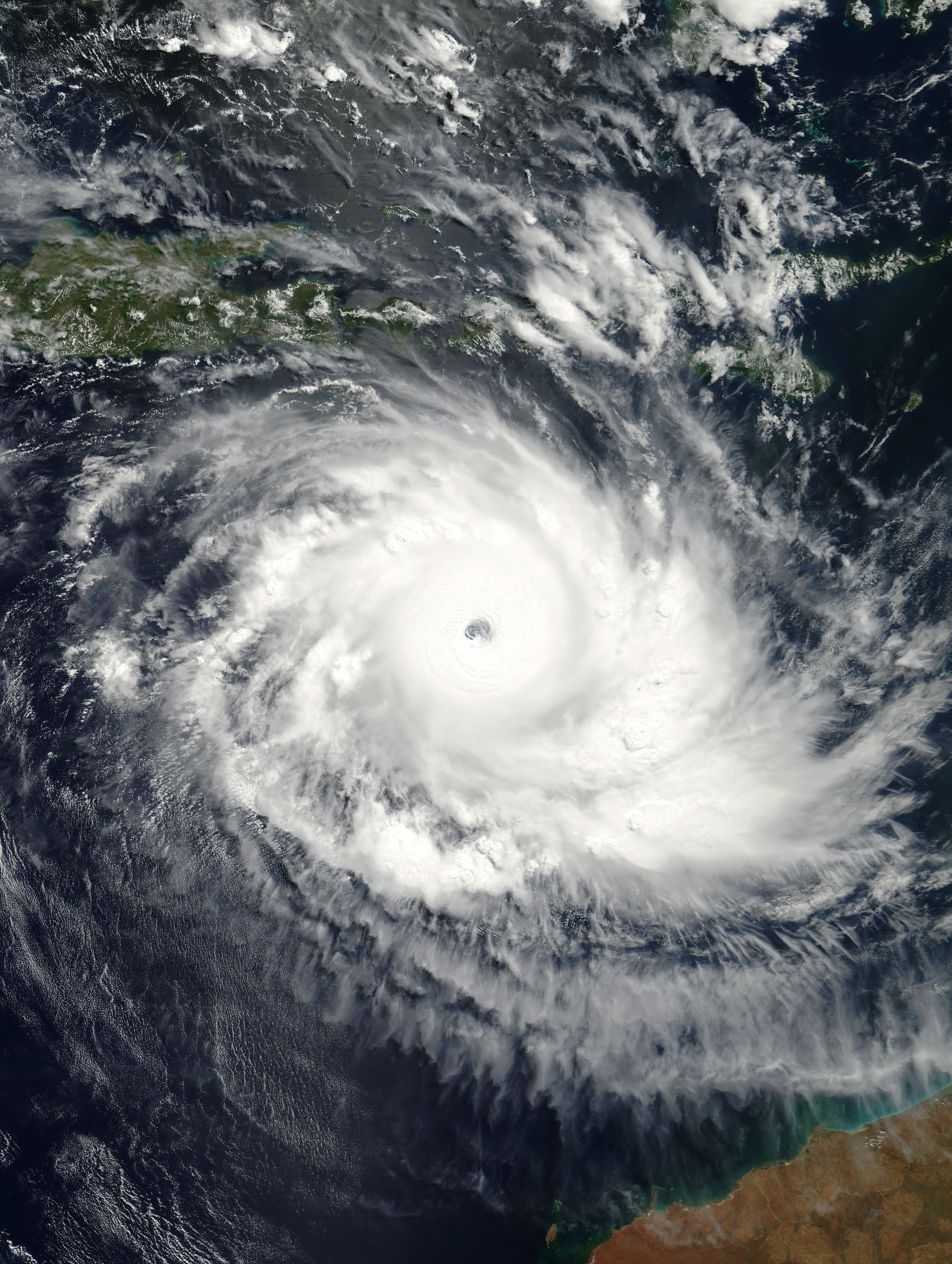
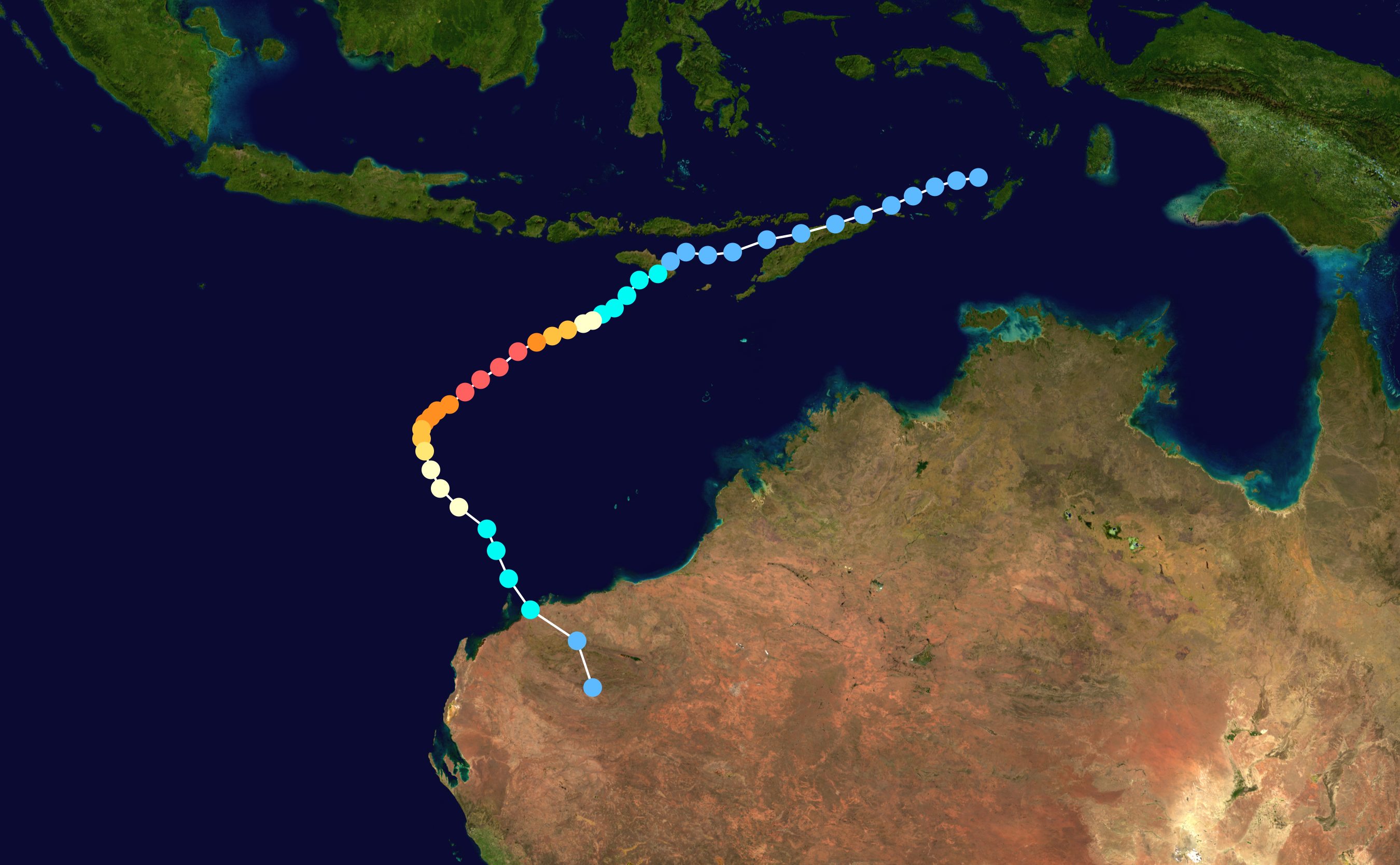
- Duration: 30 March – 8 April
- Peak intensity: 230 km/h (145 mph) (10-min); 900 hPa (mbar)

An area of disturbed weather was located within the near-equatorial trough near Papua New Guinea in late March. Despite easterly wind shear, a tropical low developed on 30 March, shortly before crossing the island of Flores. Decreasing wind shear allowed the low to strengthen into a tropical cyclone while crossing the Savu Sea on 1 April. Later that day, the JTWC initiated advisories on Tropical Cyclone 26S. On 2 April, BOM classified the low as Tropical Cyclone Inigo. An eye feature gradually organized as winds increased to 130 km/h (81 mph) early on 3 April. As a result, the BOM began classifying Inigo as a severe tropical cyclone. Later on 3 April, low wind shear and strong divergence allowed the cyclone to undergo rapid intensification as the eye became well-defined.

At 0600 UTC 4 April, Inigo peaked with sustained winds of 240 km/h (150 mph), according to BOM. Based on the pressure-wind relationship, it was estimated that Inigo reached a minimum barometric pressure of 900 mbar (27 inHg). Thus, the storm tied with Cyclone Gwenda as the most intense tropical cyclone in the Australian cyclone region. Simultaneously, JTWC indicated the Inigo peaked with sustained winds of 260 km/h (160 mph). However, later on 4 April, increasing wind shear began to weaken Inigo. On the following day, the eye became cloud-filled and by 7 April, Inigo weakened to Category 2 status. Inigo made landfall in the Pilbara region of Western Australia on 8 April with winds of 75 km/h (47 mph). The circulation dissipated within 12 hours after moving ashore.

The precursor tropical disturbance dropped heavy rainfall in eastern Indonesia. In Kupang on West Timor, the system destroyed hundreds of homes and large fields of corn, bean, and rice crop. Heavy damage was reported near Ende, where flooding and mudslides destroyed 20 houses and destroyed the roads connecting to East Flores. In Ende, a total of 294 animals were killed. In East Flores Regency in eastern Flores Island, the system left 75 destroyed houses, along with 77 severely damaged and a further 56 receiving light damage. Damage in Indonesia totaled less than $6 million, and 102 injuries were reported. In addition, 58 fatalities were reported. In Australia, the storm dropped 128 mm (5.0 in) of rain in 80 minutes.

=== Tropical Cyclone Epi ===
- Category 1 tropical cyclone (Australian scale)
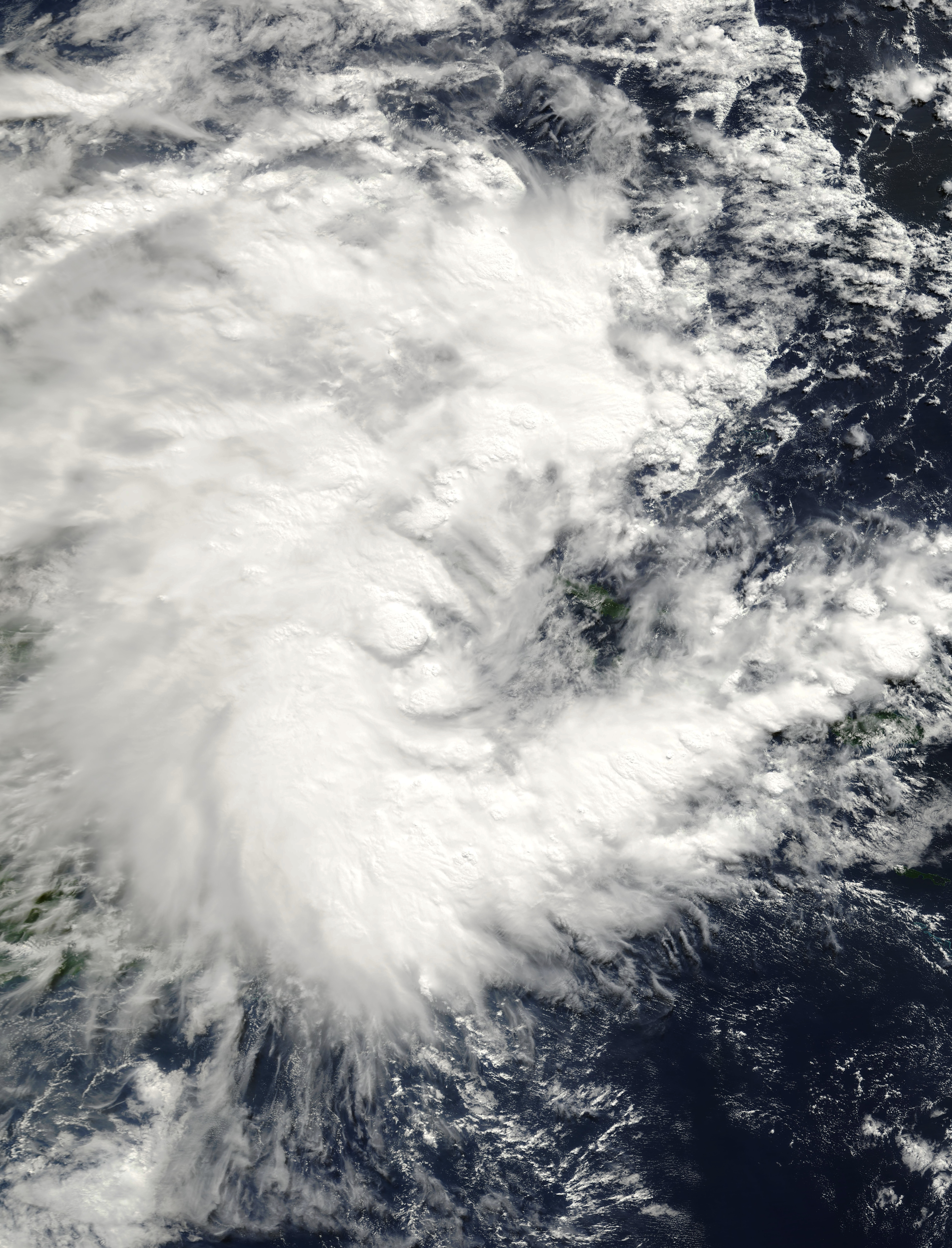
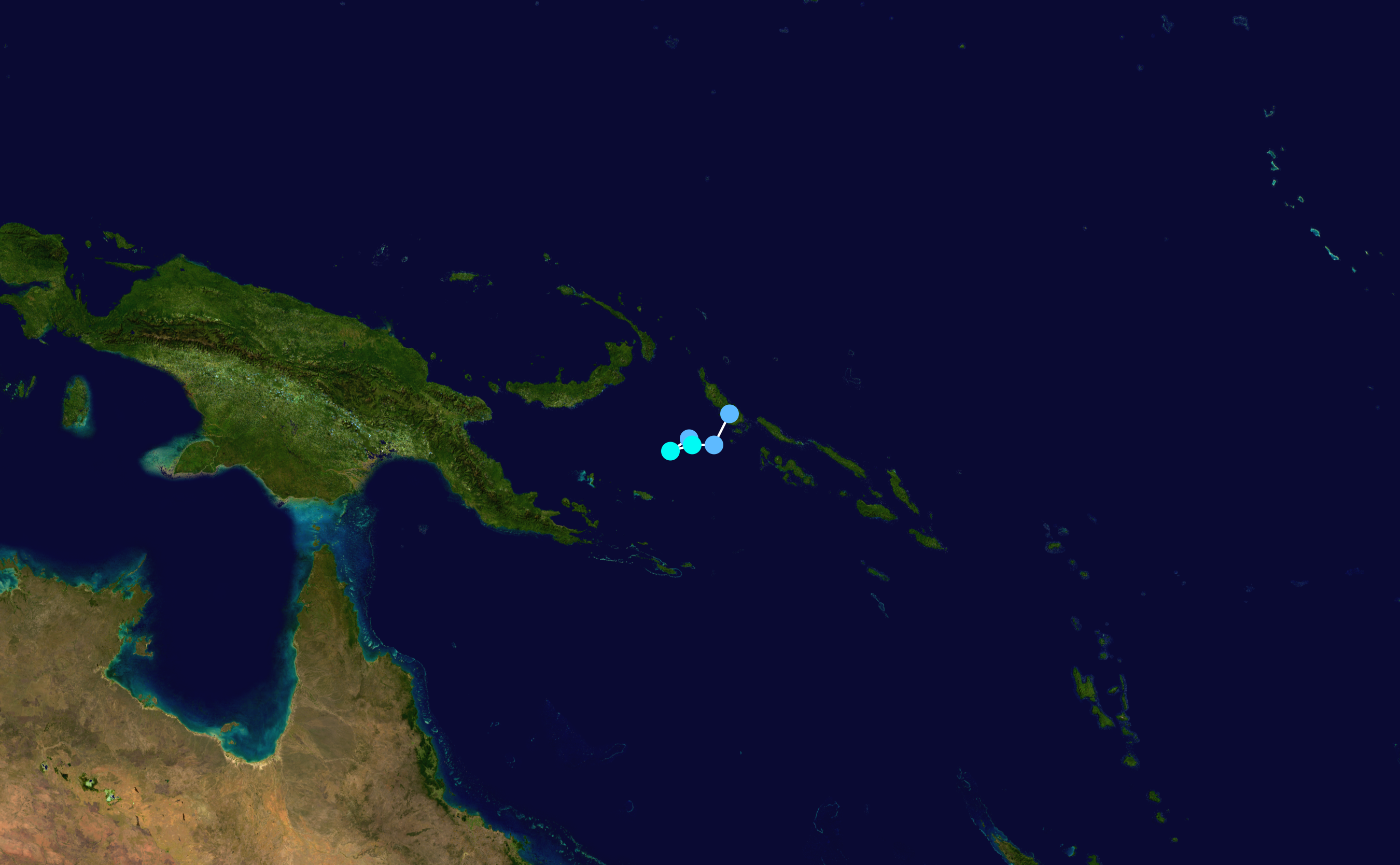
- Duration: 5 June – 6 June
- Peak intensity: 75 km/h (45 mph) (10-min); 993 hPa (mbar)

In early June, an area of fairly persistent convection stretched from Papua New Guinea to just north of Fiji. Around 0630 UTC on 5 June, Epi developed near Woodlack Island, unusually close to the Equator. Initially, the storm appeared to be undergoing rapid deepening, prompting the JTWC to issue a TCFA. However, strong wind shear caused the system to quickly become less organized and the TCFA was soon cancelled. A very short lived cyclone, a Papua New Guinea warning during the late morning hour of 5 June placed Epi's center about 130 km (81 mi) northeast of Woodlack Island. It was never recognized as a tropical cyclone by the JTWC, the third and final warning was issued later that day after winds fell below gale force.

=== Other systems ===
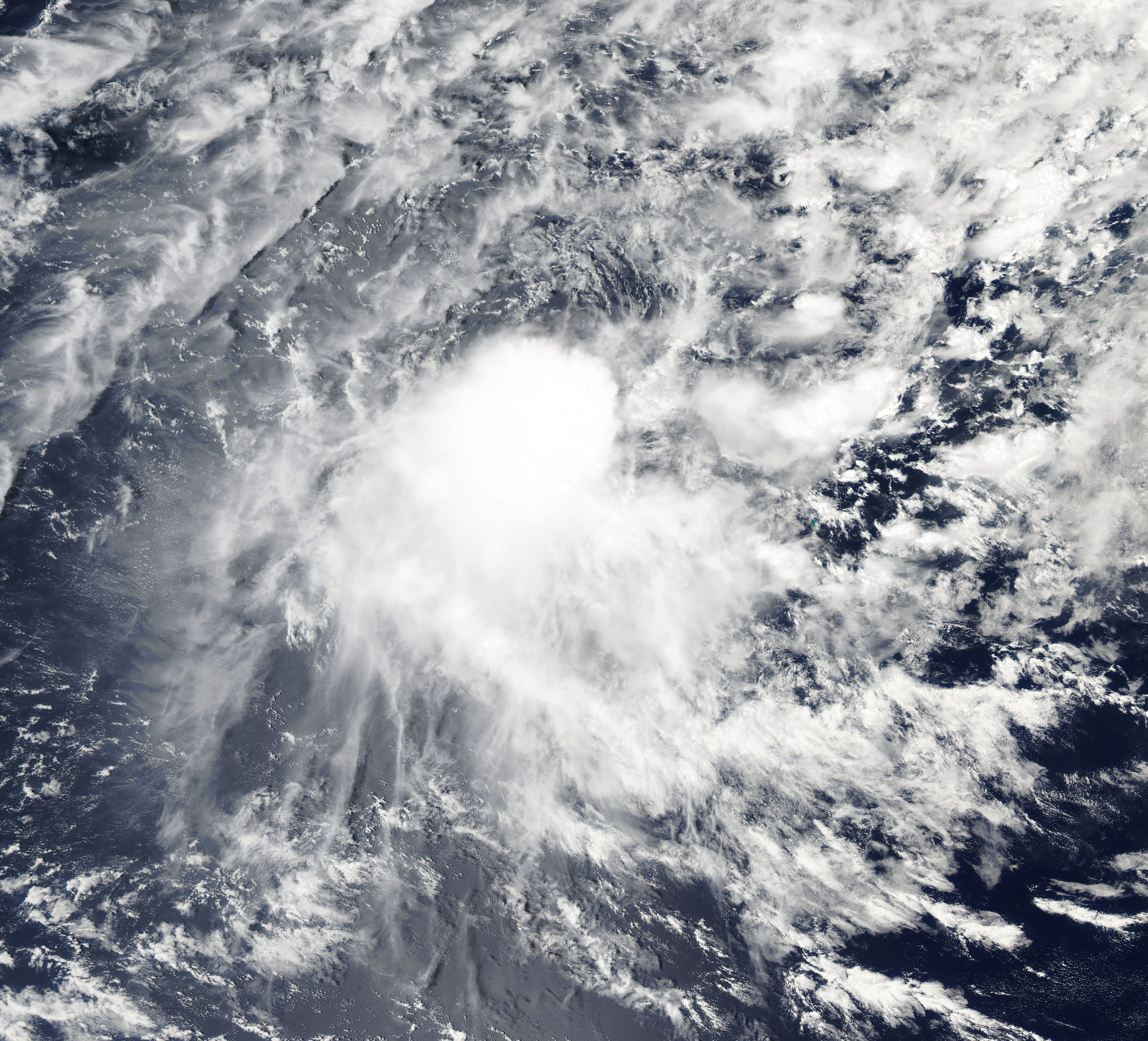
A possible near-equatorial tropical depression on 29 December

Tropical Cyclone 07S developed in the southwestern Indian Ocean on 25 December, while located about 1,345 km (836 mi) west-northwest of Cocos Islands. It initially drifted southwest and then turned eastward on 27 December. Around this time, 07S entered Perth's Area Of Responsibility (AOR). The JTWC estimated that 07S peaked with 1-minute maximum sustained winds of 55 km/h (34 mph) and a minimum barometric pressure of 1,006 mbar (29.7 inHg). (Note: Maximum sustained wind data from the Joint Typhoon Warning Center (JTWC) are in 1-minute intervals, while the other agencies such as the Bureau of Meteorology (BOM) use 10-minute intervals) The storm drifted erratically and by 1800 UTC on 28 December, the JTWC issued its final warning on 07S, while situated about 465 km (289 mi) west-northwest of Cocos Islands. However, TCWC Perth continued Tropical Weather Outlooks (TWOs) on the system until 3 January.

== Storm names ==
TCWC Perth

- Fiona
- Graham
- Harriet
- Inigo

TCWC Darwin

- Craig

TCWC Brisbane

- Erica

TCWC Port Moresby

- Epi

== Season effects ==
This is a table of all of the storms that have formed in the 2002–03 Australian region cyclone season. It includes their duration, names, landfall(s)–denoted by bold location names – damages, and death totals. Damage and deaths include totals while the storm was extratropical, a wave or a low, and all of the damage figures are in 2003 USD.

Name	Dates	Peak intensity			Areas affected	Damage (USD)	Deaths	Ref(s).
Name	Dates	Category	Wind speed	Pressure	Areas affected	Damage (USD)	Deaths	Ref(s).
Unnamed	4 - 25 January	Category 2 tropical cyclone	95 km/h (60 mph)	985 hPa (29.09 inHg)	Northern Territory, Western Australia	Unknown	Unknown	
Beni	1 – 5 February	Category 1 tropical cyclone	65 km/h (40 mph)	995 hPa (29.38 inHg)	Queensland, Solomon Islands; Vanuatu, New Caledonia	$6 million	1	
Fiona	3–13 February	Category 4 severe tropical cyclone	175 km/h (109 mph)	935 hPa (27.61 inHg)	None	None	None	
Graham	24 February – 1 March	Category 1 tropical cyclone	75 km/h (45 mph)	985 hPa (29.09 inHg)	Western Australia	Unknown	1	
Harriet	1 – 11 March	Category 1 tropical cyclone	85 km/h (50 mph)	985 hPa (29.09 inHg)	Western Australia	None	None	
Erica	1–12 March	Category 3 severe tropical cyclone	150 km/h (93 mph)	960 hPa (28.35 inHg)	New Caledonia	Unknown	Unknown	
Craig	7 - 12 March 2003	Category 2 tropical cyclone	100 km/h (62 mph)	976 hPa (28.82 inHg)	Northern Territory, Queensland	Unknown	None	
Inigo	30 March – 8 April	Category 5 severe tropical cyclone	230 km/h (140 mph)	900 hPa (26.58 inHg)	Indonesia, Western Australia	$6 million	58	
Epi	5 — 6 June	Category 1 tropical cyclone	65 km/h (40 mph)	993 hPa (29.32 inHg)	Papua New Guinea	Unknown	Unknown	
Season aggregates
10 systems	4 January 2003 – 6 June 2003		240 km/h (150 mph)	900 hPa (26.58 inHg)		$12 million	60	

== See also ==
- List of Southern Hemisphere tropical cyclone seasons
- Atlantic hurricane seasons: 2002, 2003
- Pacific hurricane seasons: 2002, 2003
- Pacific typhoon seasons: 2002, 2003
- North Indian Ocean cyclone seasons: 2002, 2003
