= Cyclone Inigo =

Category 5 Australian region cyclone in 2003

Severe Tropical Cyclone Inigo
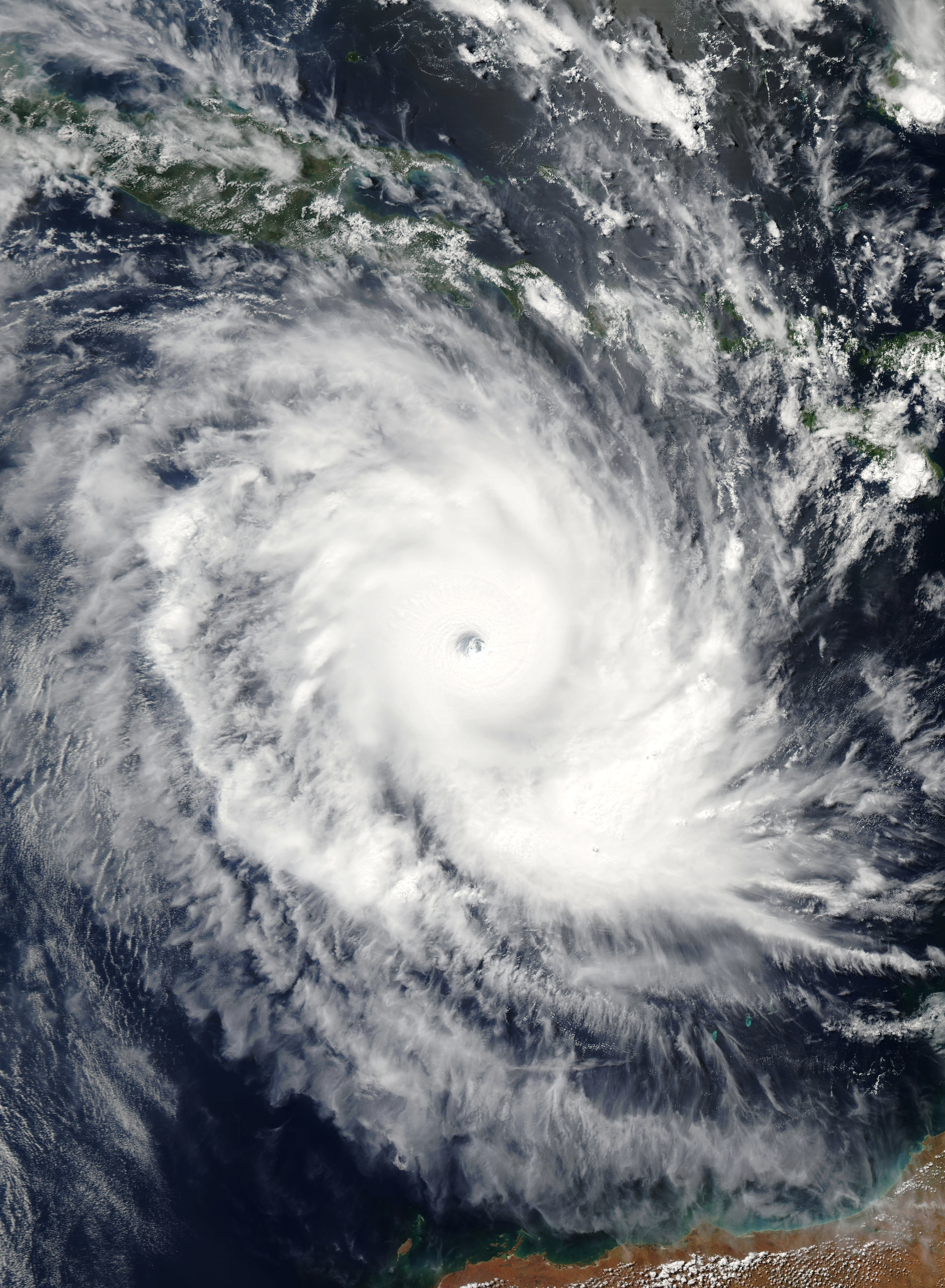
- Cyclone Inigo at its record-tying peak intensity on 4 April

Meteorological history
- Formed: 30 March 2003
- Dissipated: 8 April 2003

Category 5 severe tropical cyclone
- 10-minute sustained (BOM)
- Highest winds: 230 km/h (145 mph)
- Lowest pressure: 900 hPa (mbar); 26.58 inHg (Record low in Australian region; tied with Gwenda)

Category 5-equivalent tropical cyclone
- 1-minute sustained (SSHWS/JTWC)
- Highest winds: 260 km/h (160 mph)
- Lowest pressure: 898 hPa (mbar); 26.52 inHg

Overall effects
- Fatalities: 58 direct
- Damage: ~$6 million (2003 USD)
- Areas affected: Indonesia; Western Australia; East Timor
- IBTrACS
- Part of the 2002–03 Australian region cyclone season

Severe Tropical Cyclone Inigo is tied with Cyclone Gwenda for being the most intense recorded cyclone in the Australian region in terms of pressure, with the possible exception of Cyclone Mahina. Inigo developed from a tropical low that crossed eastern Indonesia in late March 2003. Becoming a named tropical cyclone on 1 April, Inigo rapidly intensified as it tracked southwestward, reaching a minimum central pressure of 900 hPa on 4 April with maximum 1 minute sustained winds of 170 mph. An approaching trough weakened the cyclone and turned it to the southeast, and on 8 April, Inigo dissipated after making landfall on Western Australia, as a minimal tropical storm.

The precursor disturbance dropped heavy rainfall across eastern Indonesia, causing widespread flooding and mudslides. The worst of the damage was on Flores island, though damage was also reported on West Timor and Sumba. The flooding and mudslides damaged or destroyed thousands of houses, forcing many to leave their homes. A total of 58 casualties were reported in association with Inigo, as a disturbance. In Australia, Inigo produced locally heavy rainfall, but did little damage.

== Meteorological history ==
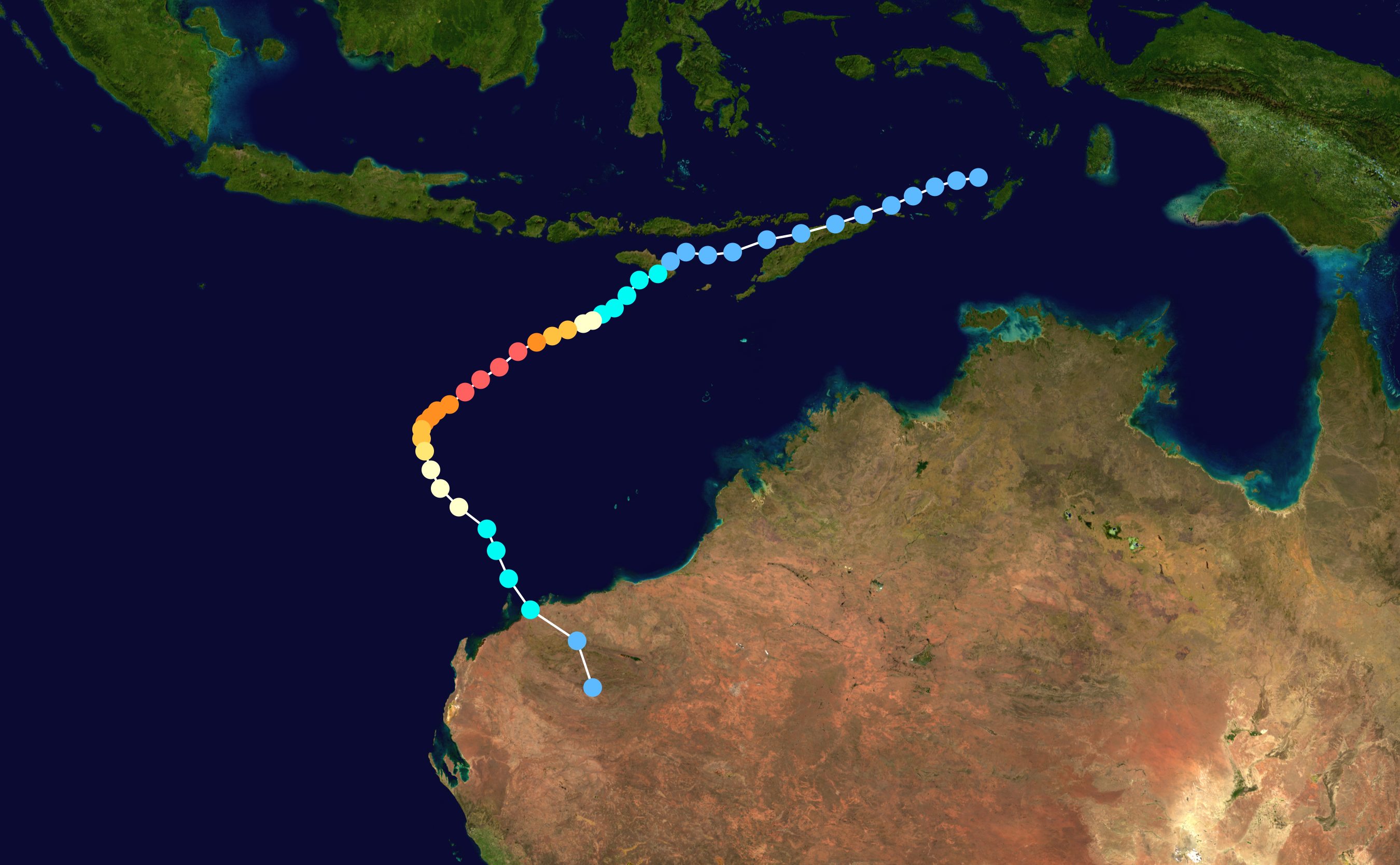
Map plotting the storm's track and intensity, according to the Saffir–Simpson scale Map key Saffir–Simpson scale Tropical depression (≤38 mph, ≤62 km/h) Tropical storm (39–73 mph, 63–118 km/h) Category 1 (74–95 mph, 119–153 km/h) Category 2 (96–110 mph, 154–177 km/h) Category 3 (111–129 mph, 178–208 km/h) Category 4 (130–156 mph, 209–251 km/h) Category 5 (≥157 mph, ≥252 km/h) Unknown Storm type Tropical cyclone Subtropical cyclone Extratropical cyclone, remnant low, tropical disturbance, or monsoon depression

On 26 March, an area of disturbed weather was located within the near-equatorial trough near Papua New Guinea. Initially located within an area of easterly wind shear, it tracked westward, due to the presence of a ridge to its south, and on 27 March, a low-pressure area formed over Western New Guinea. Thunderstorm activity increased around a mid-level circulation as it crossed into the Arafura Sea, and its overall organisation continued to increase. On 29 March, a low-level circulation was visible, though significant tropical development was prevented due to wind shear and land interaction with islands in the Indonesian archipelago. The system developed into a tropical low on 30 March. After turning to the southwest, the tropical low crossed the island of Flores on 31 March; upon doing so, the storm's convection greatly increased, due to increased upper-level divergence, which produced heavy rainfall on Flores and Timor. On 1 April, wind shear decreased as the system crossed into the Savu Sea, and the storm developed into a tropical cyclone to the northeast of Sumba.

At 1200 UTC on 1 April, the Joint Typhoon Warning Center (JTWC) issued its first advisory on the system, classifying it as Tropical Cyclone 26S. At 0000 UTC on 2 April, the Bureau of Meteorology (BOM) warning centre in Perth classified the system as Tropical Cyclone Inigo. The storm quickly intensified as it tracked southwestward, aided by low wind shear and strong divergence. An eye featured gradually organised, and early on 3 April, the BOM classified Inigo as a severe tropical cyclone, with winds of 80 mph (130 km/h). Later that day, the cyclone underwent rapid intensification, as the eye became increasingly better defined. On 4 April, Inigo attained Category 5 status on the Australian cyclone scale, and at 0600 UTC, Inigo reached peak winds of 240 km/h (150 mph) and an estimated minimum pressure of 900 hPa (mbar), while located about 950 km (590 mi) north of Onslow, Western Australia. Around the same time, the JTWC assessed Inigo as a powerful cyclone with 1-min winds of 260 km/h (160 mph). With a minimum pressure of 900 hPa, Inigo tied Cyclone Gwenda of the 1998–99 season as the most intense tropical cyclone on record in the Australian cyclone region.

Upon reaching peak intensity, Inigo maintained an eyewall 32 km (20 mi) in diameter. Late on 4 April, an approaching upper-level trough increased wind shear over the system, which caused a steady weakening trend. On 5 April, the eye became cloud-filled, and later that day the cyclone reached its westernmost point before the approaching trough turned it to the southeast. By 7 April, its winds decreased to below severe tropical cyclone status, or below 120 km/h (75 mph). The convection continued to decrease, leaving the centre exposed from the convection as it made landfall early on 8 April, in the Pilbara region of Western Australia. Upon moving ashore, Inigo had winds of around 75 km/h (47 mph). Inigo's circulation dissipated within 12 hours after moving ashore.

== Impact ==
Most intense Australian cyclones
Rank	Cyclone	Year	Min. pressure
1	Gwenda	1999	900 hPa (26.58 inHg)
1	Inigo	2003	900 hPa (26.58 inHg)
3	George	2007	902 hPa (26.64 inHg)
4	Orson	1989	904 hPa (26.70 inHg)
5	Marcus	2018	905 hPa (26.72 inHg)
6	Theodore	1994	910 hPa (26.87 inHg)
6	Vance	1999	910 hPa (26.87 inHg)
6	Fay	2004	910 hPa (26.87 inHg)
6	Glenda	2006	910 hPa (26.87 inHg)
10	Mahina	1899	914 hPa (26.99 inHg) (Note: Currently, the World Meteorological Organization recognises the lowest pressure of Cyclone Mahina as 27 inches of mercury (914 hPa) based on an observation from the time. A 2014 reconstruction project of Cyclone Mahina by the American Meteorological Society concluded that the 13 metre storm surge produced by the cyclone likely produced barometric pressure levels as low as 880 hPa, which would place it as the strongest tropical cyclone in the Southern Hemisphere, but the metric is not yet approved by the WMO.)
Source: Australian Bureau of Meteorology

The precursor tropical disturbance dropped heavy rainfall in eastern Indonesia; on the island of Flores, Larantuka recorded 223 mm (8.8 in) in a 24-hour period. The rainfall caused flash flooding and mudslides, primarily in Flores but also on West Timor and Sumba. In some locations, the depth of the floodwaters reached 5 meters (16 feet). The Oessao River in West Timor exceeded its banks, which flooded seven villages. In Kupang in West Timor, the system destroyed hundreds of homes and large fields of corn, bean, and rice crop. Heavy damage was reported near Ende, where flooding and mudslides destroyed 20 houses and destroyed the roads connecting to East Flores. In Ende, a total of 294 animals were killed. The city's airport was flooded with one meter (3.3 feet) of water, preventing aerial transportation and leaving the city temporarily isolated. In East Flores Regency in eastern Flores Island, the system left 75 destroyed houses, along with 77 severely damaged and a further 56 receiving light damage. Damage in Indonesia totalled less than $6 million (2003 USD, $6.8 million 2007 USD), and 102 injuries were reported. The Indonesian representative to the Tropical Cyclone Committee of the World Meteorological Organization in 2004 reported the death toll related to the disaster in Indonesia as 58 fatalities.

Additionally, the precursor disturbance produced rough seas along the coastlines, which resulting in the sinking of 12 sailing vessels. Two ships, each with a crew of five to eight people, were reported missing to the southwest of Sumba, after Cyclone Inigo passed over their location on 3 April.

Inigo moved ashore on Australia as a weak tropical cyclone, though several locations reported winds near gale force. The storm dropped light to moderate precipitation near its landfall location, with a maximum rainfall total of 226 mm (8.9 in), of which 128 mm (5.0 in) of rain fell in 80 minutes. No casualties or significant damage was reported in the country.

== Aftermath ==
Shortly after the storm passed through Indonesia, local government and Red Cross officials distributed assistance to the storm victims, including food, medicine, clean water, and mattresses; additionally, the government sent about Rp400 million (2003 IDR, $50,000 2003 USD). The affected citizens resided in temporary shelters, including schools, police offices, and shelters built by local governments. Officials deployed machines to remove debris from the roads affected by the landslides.

As a result of its damage, the name Inigo was retired and will not be used for another tropical cyclone in the region. Its name was replaced with Iggy, which was first used in 2012.

== See also ==
- Tropical cyclones in 2003
- Weather of 2003
- List of Category 5 Australian region severe tropical cyclones
