= Cyclone Fay =

Australian region cyclone in 2004

Severe Tropical Cyclone Fay
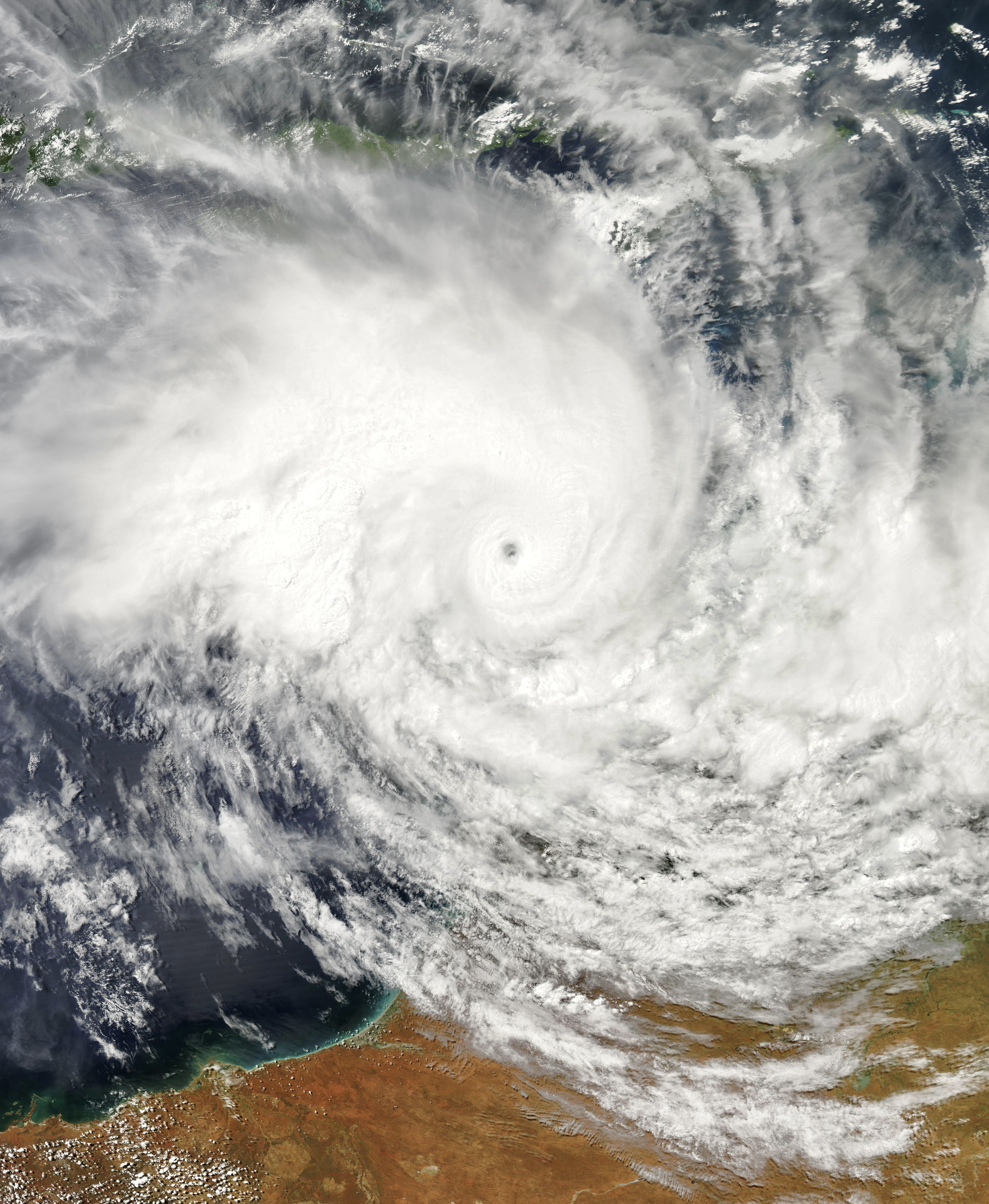
- Cyclone Fay near peak intensity on March 21

Meteorological history
- Formed: 12 March 2004
- Dissipated: 28 March 2004

Category 5 severe tropical cyclone
- 10-minute sustained (BOM)
- Highest winds: 215 km/h (130 mph)
- Lowest pressure: 910 hPa (mbar); 26.87 inHg

Category 4-equivalent tropical cyclone
- 1-minute sustained (SSHWS/JTWC)
- Highest winds: 220 km/h (140 mph)
- Lowest pressure: 922 hPa (mbar); 27.23 inHg

Overall effects
- Fatalities: None
- Damage: Minimal
- Areas affected: Northern Territory, Western Australia
- IBTrACS
- Part of the 2003–04 Australian region cyclone season

Severe Tropical Cyclone Fay was an intense late-season tropical cyclone which struck Western Australia during the 2003–04 Australian region cyclone season. Forming from an area of low pressure on 12 March, Fay was the only Category 5 cyclone during the season. The system had a minimum pressure of 910 mbar (hPa; 26.87 inHg) and maximum sustained winds of 210 km/h (130 mph). Moving towards the southwest and eventually towards the south, Fay gradually strengthened as it paralleled the northwestern coast of Australia, and made landfall on the Pilbara coast on the morning of 27 March as a Category 4 cyclone.

While no fatalities were reported, the cyclone brought record-breaking rainfall to Australia, which led to a sharp decrease in the country's gold output. The cyclone also caused minor damage in the Pilbara region of Western Australia. In the spring of 2005, the Australian Bureau of Meteorology retired the name Fay from use, and it will never be used again as a cyclone name.

== Meteorological history ==
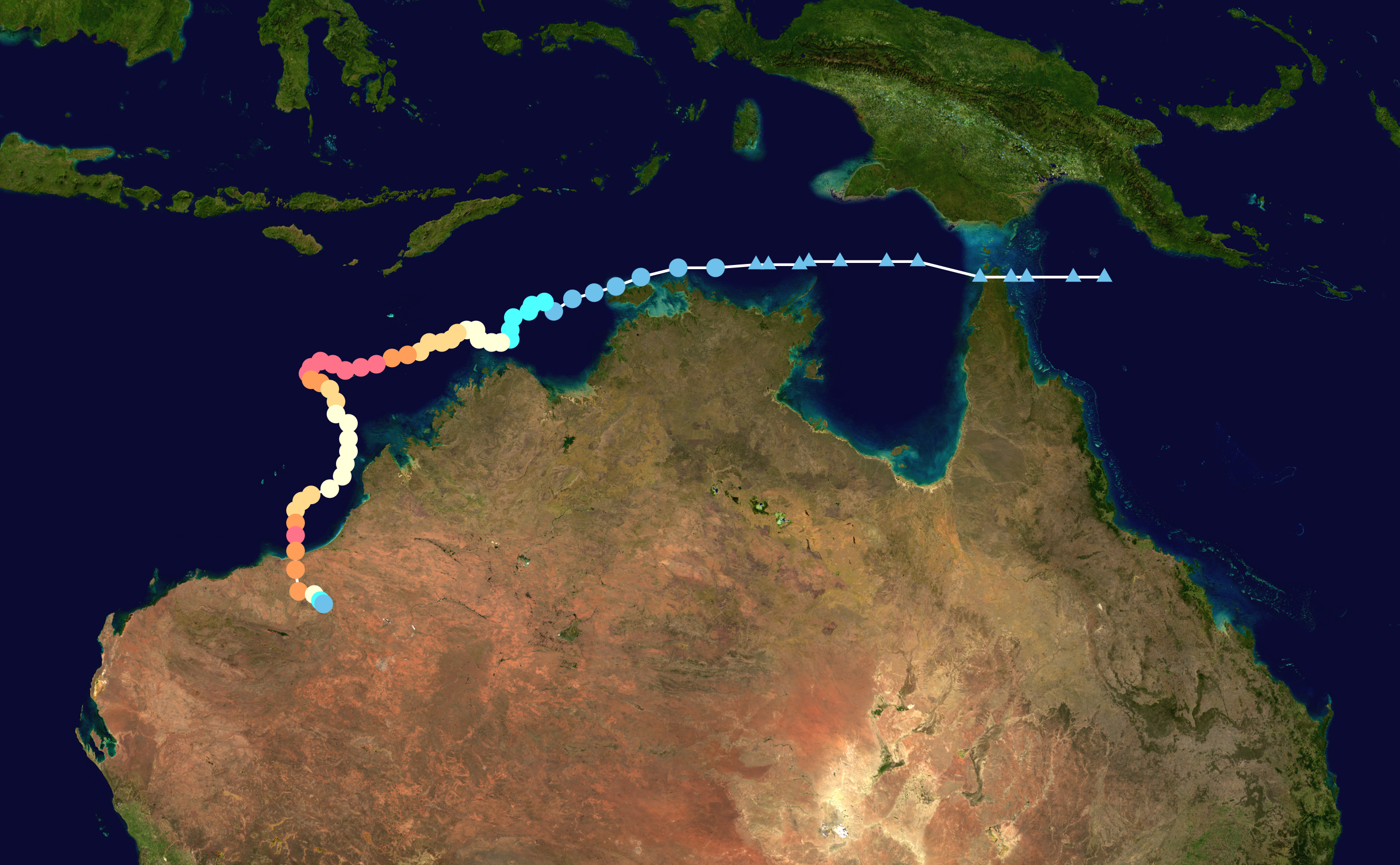
Map plotting the storm's track and intensity, according to the Saffir–Simpson scale Map key Saffir–Simpson scale Tropical depression (≤38 mph, ≤62 km/h) Tropical storm (39–73 mph, 63–118 km/h) Category 1 (74–95 mph, 119–153 km/h) Category 2 (96–110 mph, 154–177 km/h) Category 3 (111–129 mph, 178–208 km/h) Category 4 (130–156 mph, 209–251 km/h) Category 5 (≥157 mph, ≥252 km/h) Unknown Storm type Tropical cyclone Subtropical cyclone Extratropical cyclone, remnant low, tropical disturbance, or monsoon depression

The low-pressure system that later developed into Fay formed in the Gulf of Carpentaria on 12 March 2004. Through 15 March satellite imagery indicated increasing convection and organisation of the system, as well as decreasing wind sheer aloft, adding to the favourable conditions for strengthening. On 16 March, the system was designated Tropical Cyclone 18S by the Joint Typhoon Warning Center, with winds of 30 km/h (20 mph). The system then crossed Melville and Bathurst Islands and moved into the Timor Sea, where it intensified, and was given the name Fay by the Australian Bureau of Meteorology. Fay began to turn southward on 17 March; simultaneously, the cyclone continued to intensify due to a weakening of vertical wind shear, and well-defined outflow became apparent on satellite imagery. The following day, a steering ridge to the south of the system strengthened and pushed the cyclone away from the coast and to the northwest. At the same time, the system continued to intensify due to the favourable environment in the upper atmosphere. However, hot, dry air flowing into the system from the south, combined with vertical wind sheer, kept the storm from strengthening as much at its maximum potential rate.

By 19 March Fay's track had turned to the west-southwest, and over the next day it continued to strengthen in due to favourable upper-level outflow and weak vertical sheer. On 21 March, Fay became a Category 5 cyclone on the Australian Region Tropical Cyclone Intensity Scale. A mid-latitude trough caused the steering ridge to weaken, and subsequently, Fay to turn to the south. Over the next two days, the environmental shear around the cyclone decreased, which would normally have led to intensification; however, as the shear decreased, the cyclone also moved over an area of dry air, weakening the system. By 23 March, Fay had moved in a loop, and the system weakened to a Category 2. Over the next day, favourable outflow counteracted the dry air that had weakened the system, and a banding eye feature was observed on satellite imagery. Fay then encountered moister air as it moved southward, leading it to re-intensify on 25 March. A weak eye of 10 nm was observed on 26 March which grew to 15 nm as the day went on. Strengthening into a Category 4 system early on 27 March, Fay made landfall on the Pilbara coast between 8 am and 9 am AWST (0000 and 0100 UTC) with winds of 170 km/h (105 mph), weakening below cyclone strength somewhere between the towns of Nullagine and Telfer.

== Preparations and impact ==
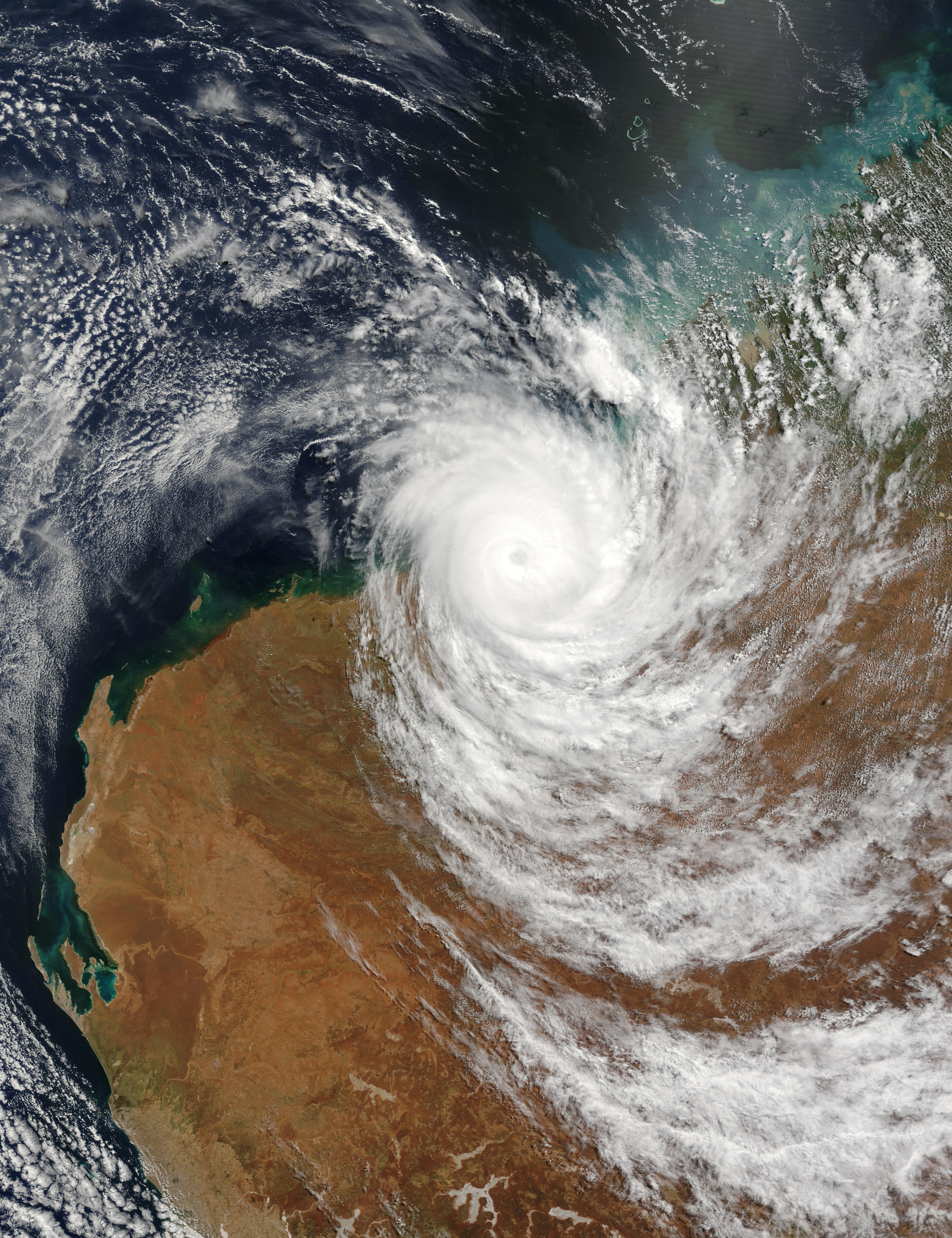
Cyclone Fay making landfall on Western Australia on March 27

Evacuation centres were set up in the Kimberley region of Western Australia. Schools and businesses were also closed, and flights in and out of the area were cancelled. Shelters were set up for people who could not take shelter in their own homes. Residents of the Bidyadanga Aboriginal community were warned of particularly dangerous storm tide as the centre of the cyclone passed to their west. The communities of Sandfire and Pardoo were also warned of dangerous storm tide. Cyclone warnings were issued for areas threatened by the system, and communities in the path of the system were warned of expected high rainfall, as amounts greater than 200 mm (7.9 in) were expected.

Minor damage to buildings and limited tree damage were reported in the vicinity of Port Hedland. In the town of Nullagine, 120 residents were evacuated to the town's police station, as heavy rain caused flooding. Flooding of the De Grey and Oakover Rivers led to the town being segmented into 4 sections. As the system passed near the Yarrie mine 200 workers were forced to go under lockdown for 8 hours. The cyclone overturned accommodation units, "shredded" water tanks, cut power lines, and damaged the rail line connecting the mine to Port Hedland.

Heavy rainfall was reported along the track of the cyclone, with a two-day total of 701 mm (27.6 in) reported at the Nifty Copper Mine and 359 mm (14.1 in) reported in Telfer. The rain from the cyclone delayed the construction of a gas pipeline at the mine for over 7 months, while the pipeline company waited for the floodwaters to dissipate. According to Newcrest Mining, the rainfall amounts at Telfer exceeded the records going back at least 100 years. The heavy rainfall from both Cyclone Monty in February and Cyclone Fay caused gold output in Australia for the quarter to be the lowest in 10 years.

A survey performed by the Australian Institute of Marine Science discovered that the Scott Reef suffered "severe damage," and many coral colonies were uprooted or damaged. Because of the record-breaking rainfall produced across northwestern Australia, the Bureau of Meteorology retired the name Fay after its usage.

== See also ==
- 2003–04 Australian region cyclone season
- Cyclone Chris
- Cyclone Kirsty
