= 2003–04 Australian region cyclone season =

Cyclone season in the Australian region

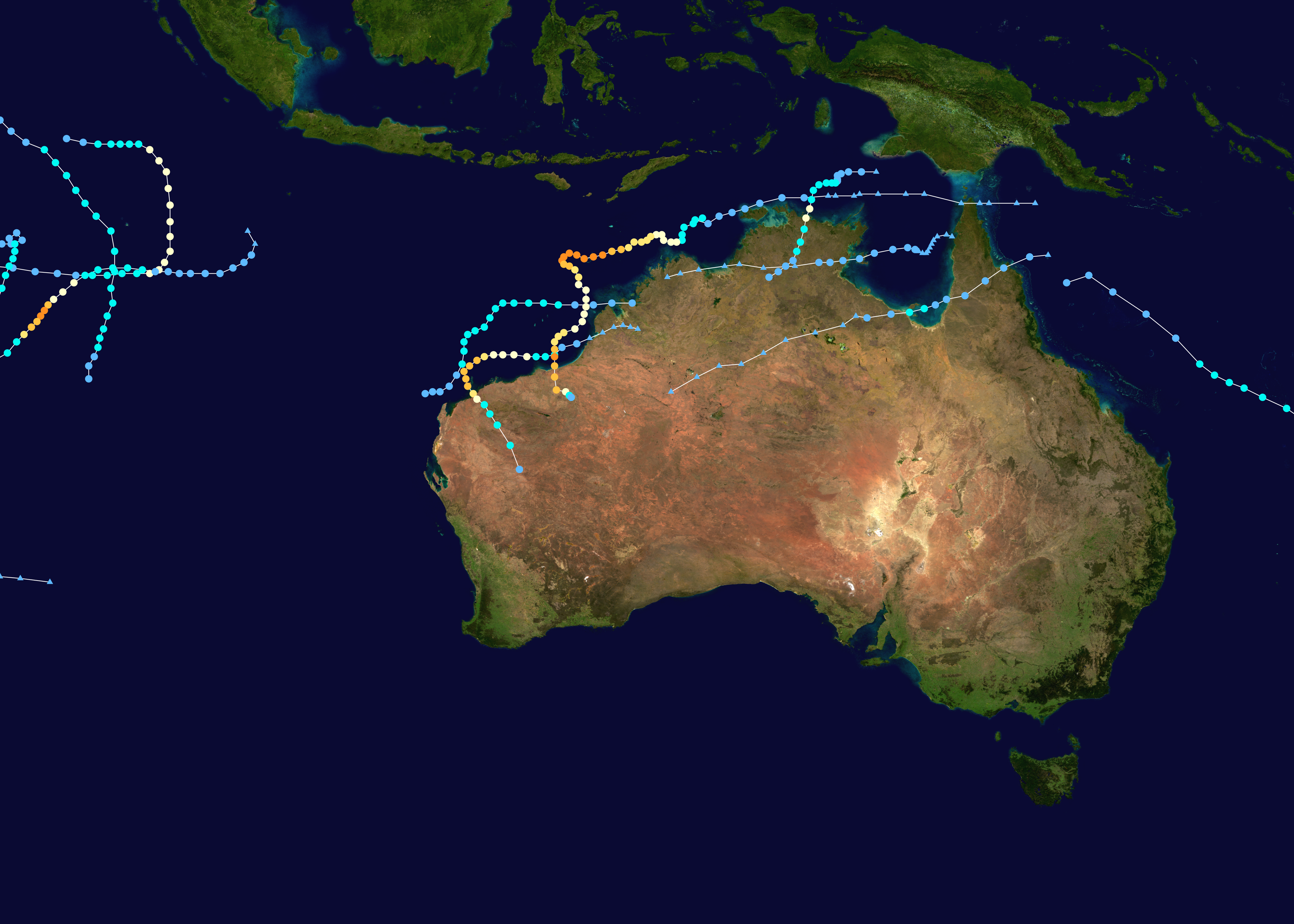
- Season summary map

Seasonal boundaries
- First system formed: 6 December 2003
- Last system dissipated: 27 March 2004

Strongest storm
- Name: Fay
  - Maximum winds: 215 km/h (130 mph) (10-minute sustained)
  - Lowest pressure: 910 hPa (mbar)

Seasonal statistics
- Tropical lows: 13
- Tropical cyclones: 9
- Severe tropical cyclones: 5
- Total fatalities: Unknown
- Total damage: Unknown

Related articles
- 2003–04 South-West Indian Ocean cyclone season; 2003–04 South Pacific cyclone season

The 2003–04 Australian region cyclone season was a slightly below average tropical cyclone season. It began on 1 November 2003 and ended on 30 April 2004. The regional tropical cyclone operational plan also defines a tropical cyclone year separately from a tropical cyclone season, which runs from 1 July 2003 to 30 June 2004.

Tropical cyclones in this area are monitored by four Tropical Cyclone Warning Centres (TCWCs): the Australian Bureau of Meteorology in Perth, Darwin, and Brisbane; and TCWC Port Moresby in Papua New Guinea.

== Systems ==
=== Severe Tropical Cyclone Jana ===
- Category 3 severe tropical cyclone (Australian scale)
- Category 1 tropical cyclone (SSHWS)
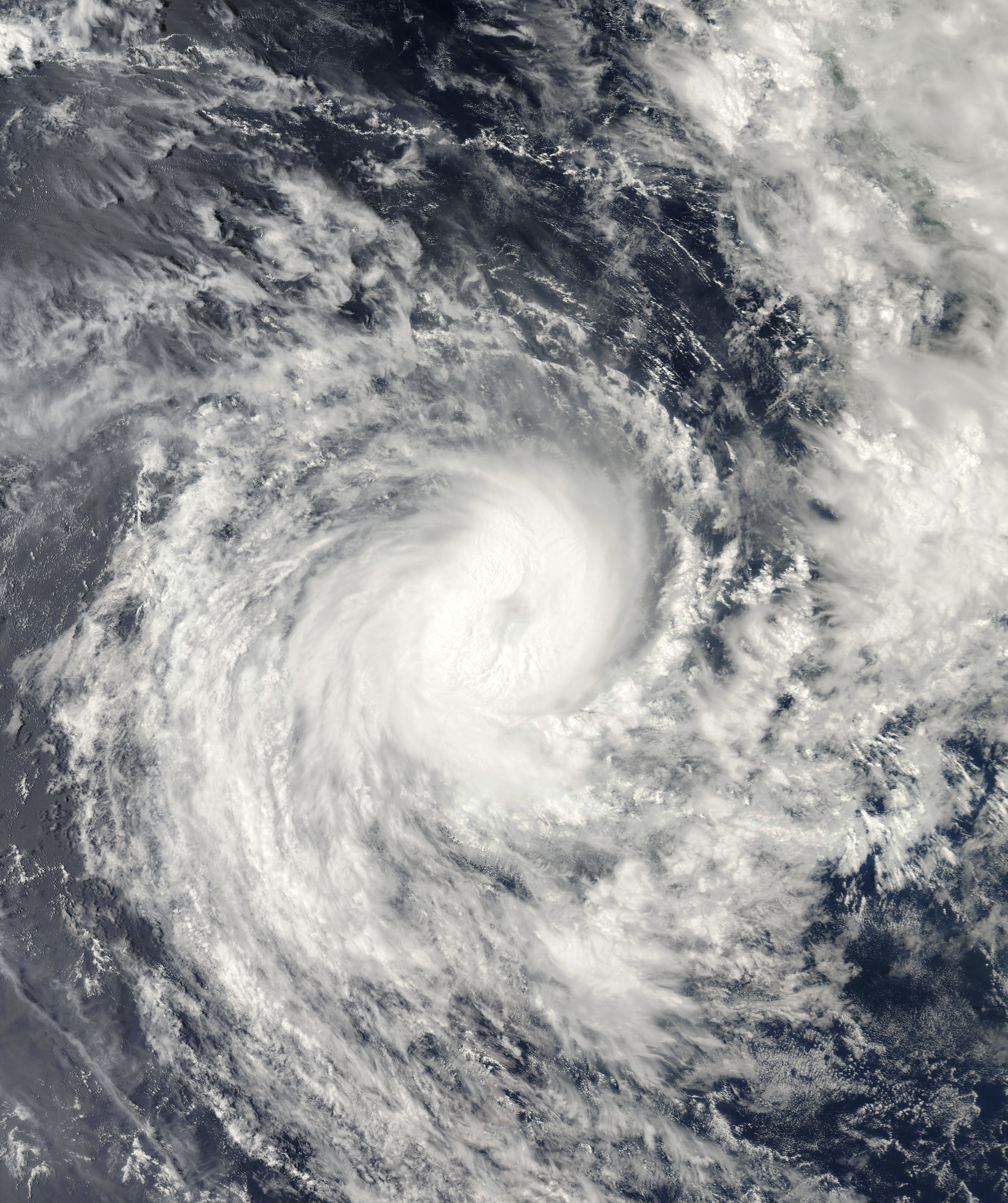
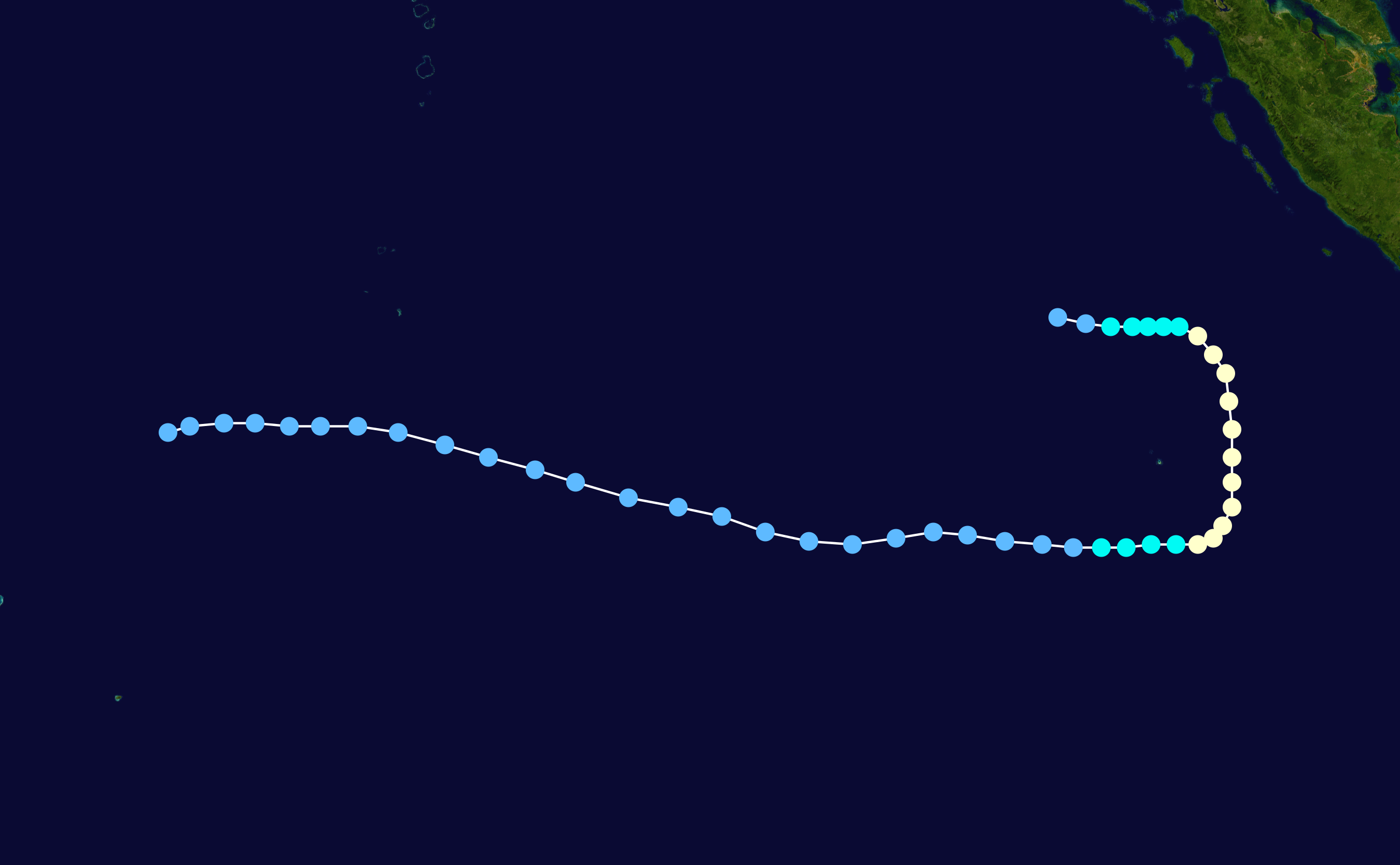
- Duration: 6 December – 12 December
- Peak intensity: 155 km/h (100 mph) (10-min); 950 hPa (mbar)

Formed on 6 December and dissipated on 12 December.

=== Severe Tropical Cyclone Debbie ===
- Category 3 severe tropical cyclone (Australian scale)
- Category 1 tropical cyclone (SSHWS)
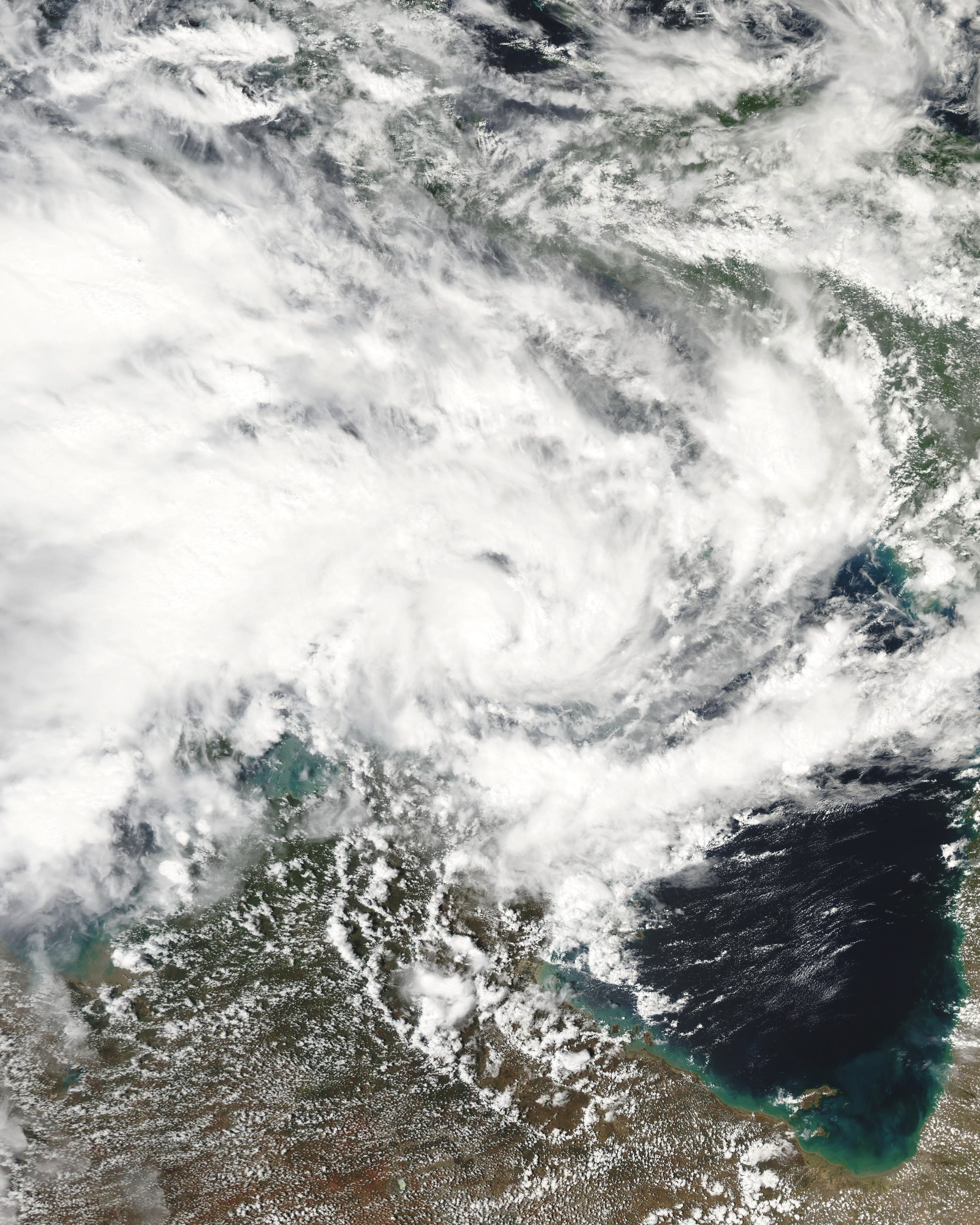
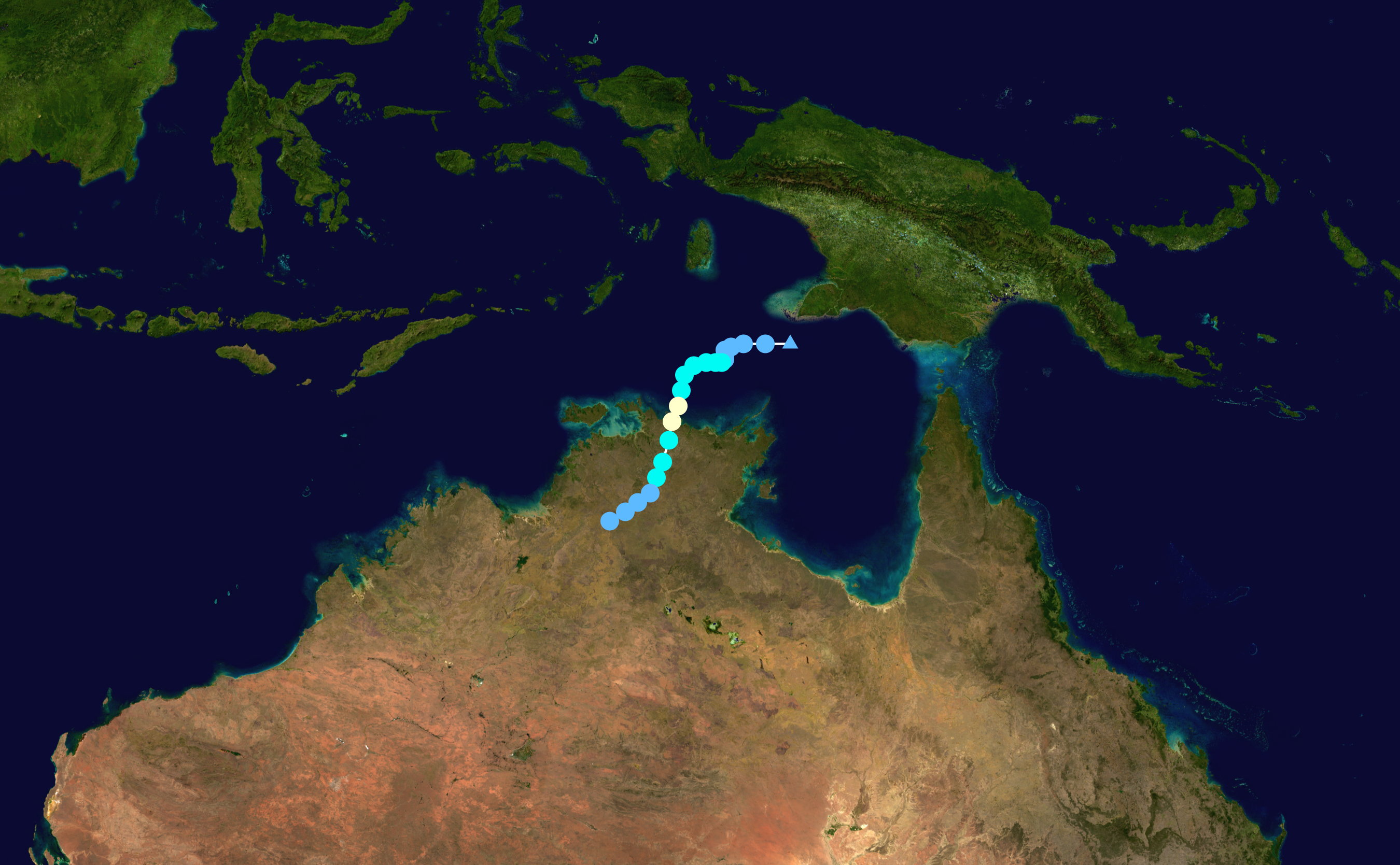
- Duration: 16 December – 23 December
- Peak intensity: 120 km/h (75 mph) (10-min); 970 hPa (mbar)

Formed on 16 December and dissipated on 23 December. Crossed the Northern Territory coast as a Category 1.

=== Tropical Low Ken ===
- Tropical low (Australian scale)
- Tropical storm (SSHWS)
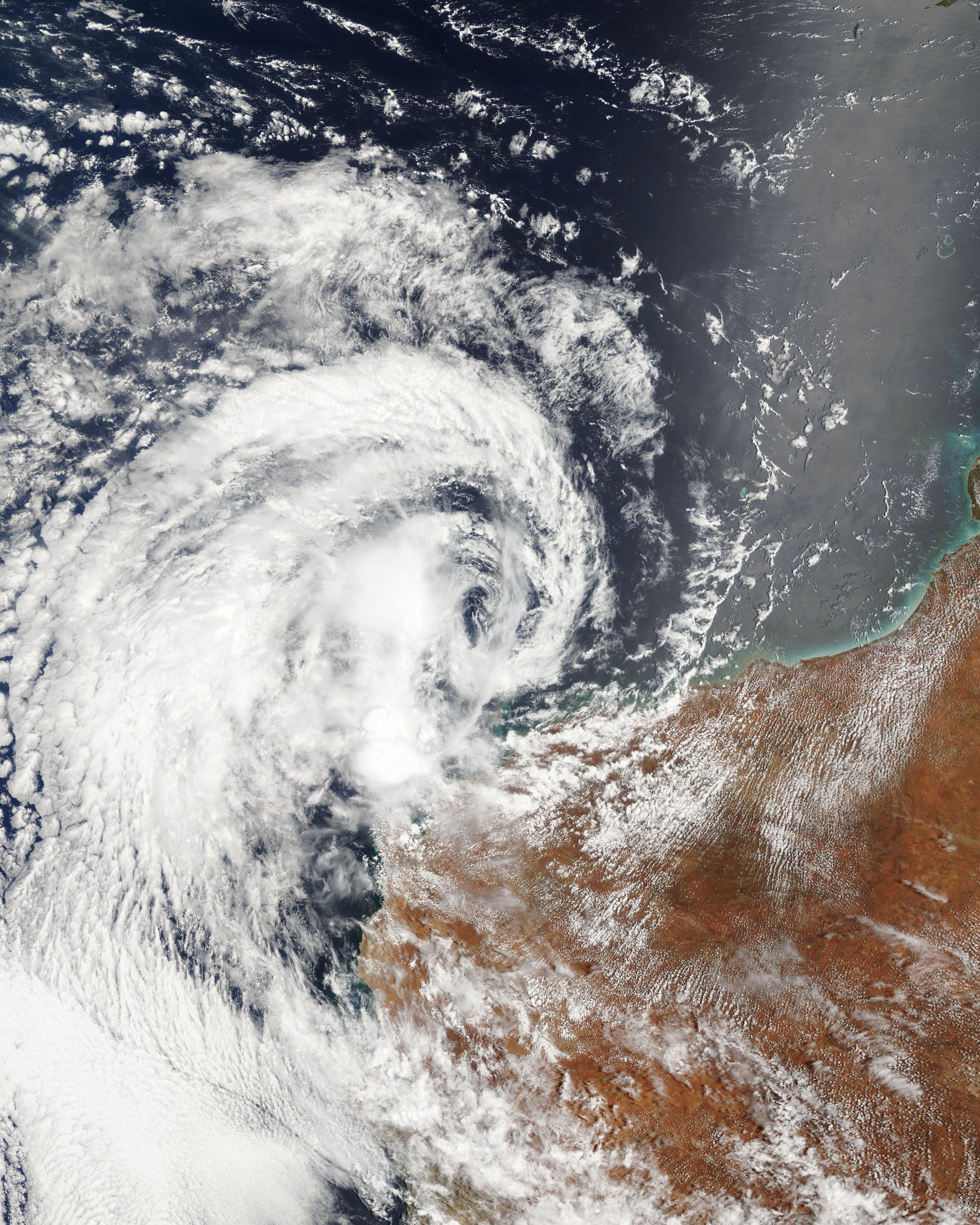
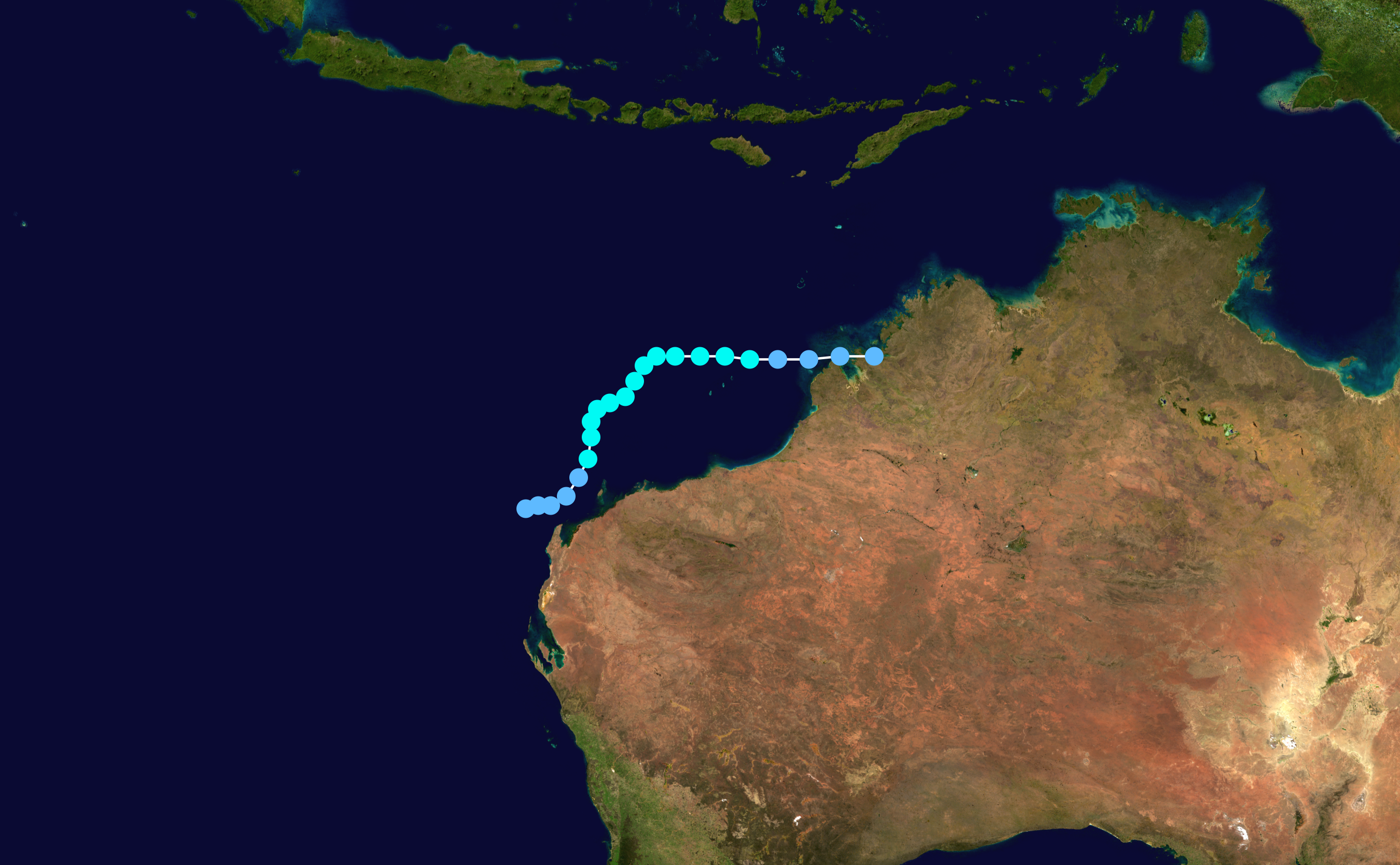
- Duration: 1 January – 6 January
- Peak intensity: 75 km/h (45 mph) (10-min); 992 hPa (mbar)

Formed on 1 January 2004 and dissipated on 6 January. Operationally monitored Ken to have reached tropical cyclone intensity for 24 hours, but post-analysis revealed that Ken never was a tropical cyclone.

=== Monsoon Depression ===
- Tropical storm (SSHWS)
- Duration: 10 January – 17 January
- Peak intensity: 65 km/h (40 mph) (1-min);

Existed between 10 and 17 January. Caused heavy rainfall across western Queensland and New South Wales.

=== Tropical Cyclone Linda ===
- Category 2 tropical cyclone (Australian scale)
- Tropical storm (SSHWS)
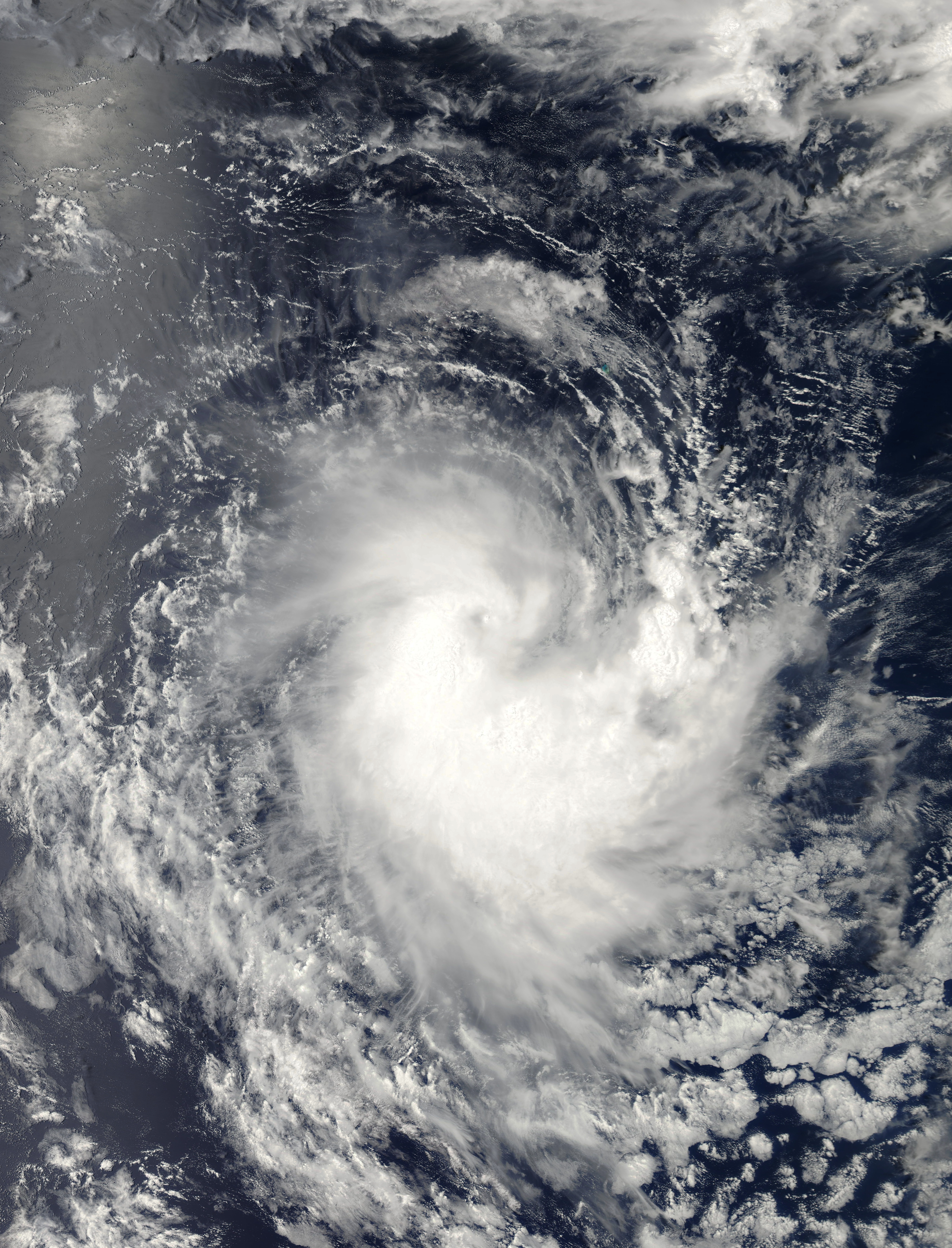
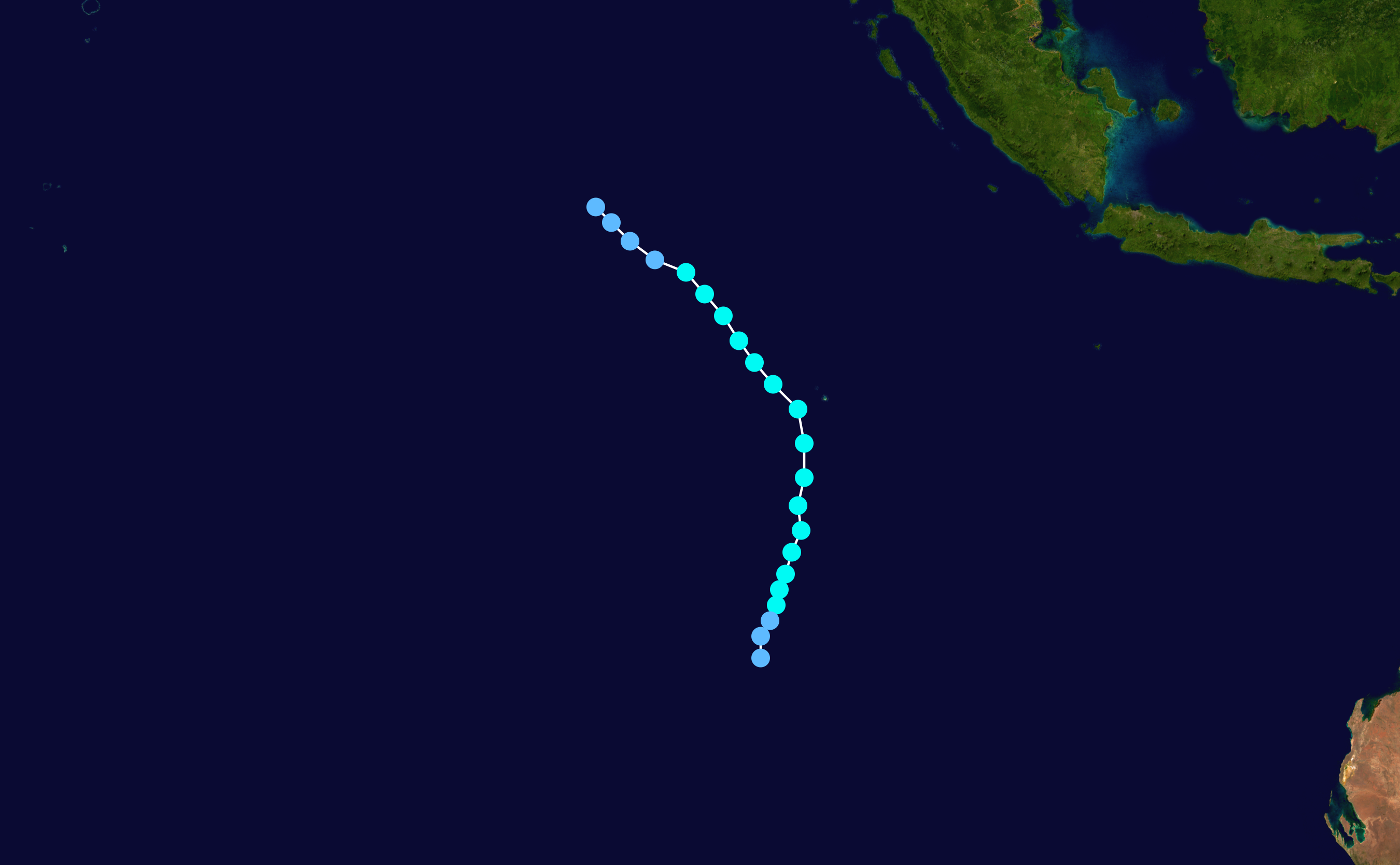
- Duration: 28 January – 1 February
- Peak intensity: 95 km/h (60 mph) (10-min); 985 hPa (mbar)

Formed on 28 January and dissipated on 1 February.

=== Tropical Cyclone Fritz ===
- Category 2 tropical cyclone (Australian scale)
- Tropical storm (SSHWS)
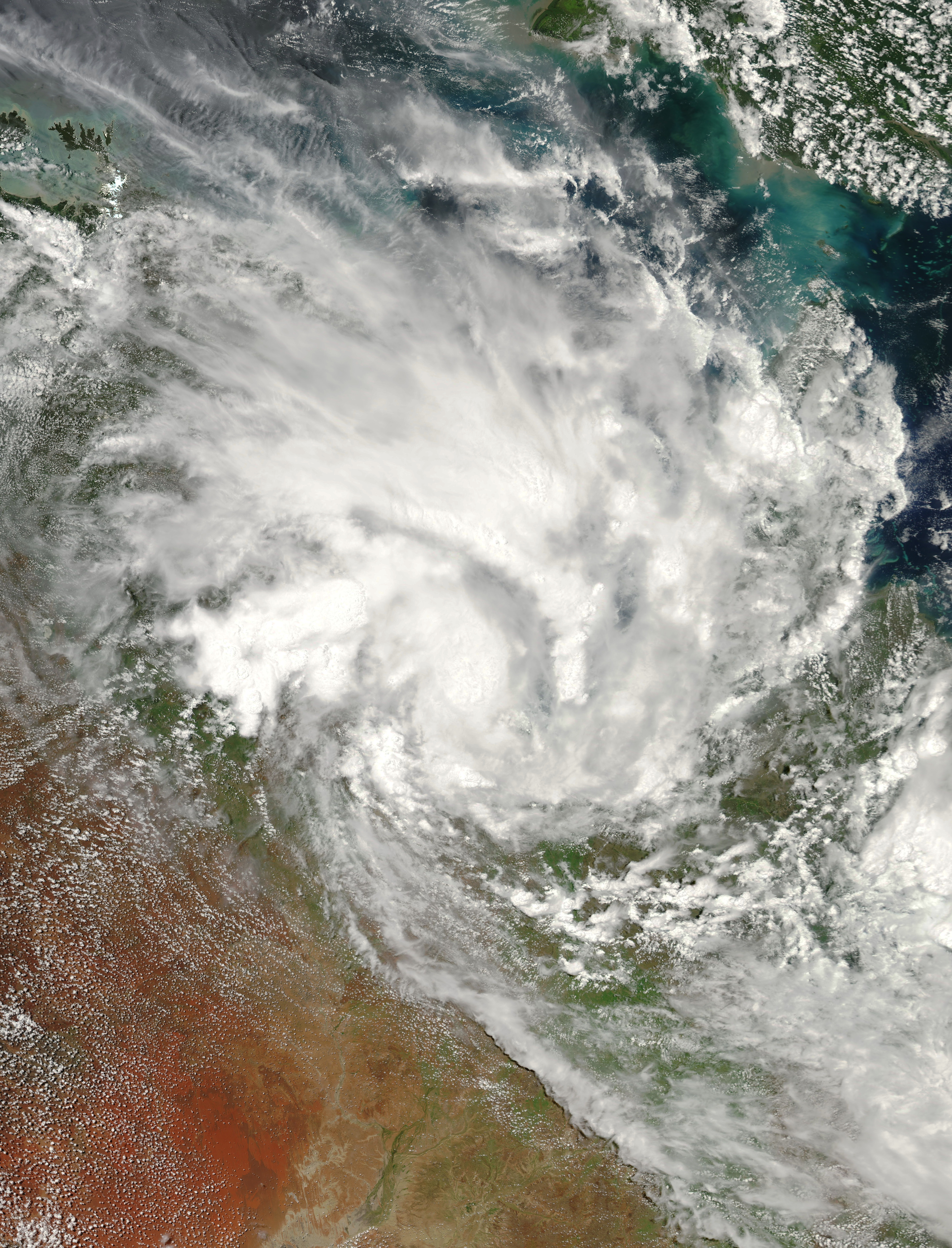
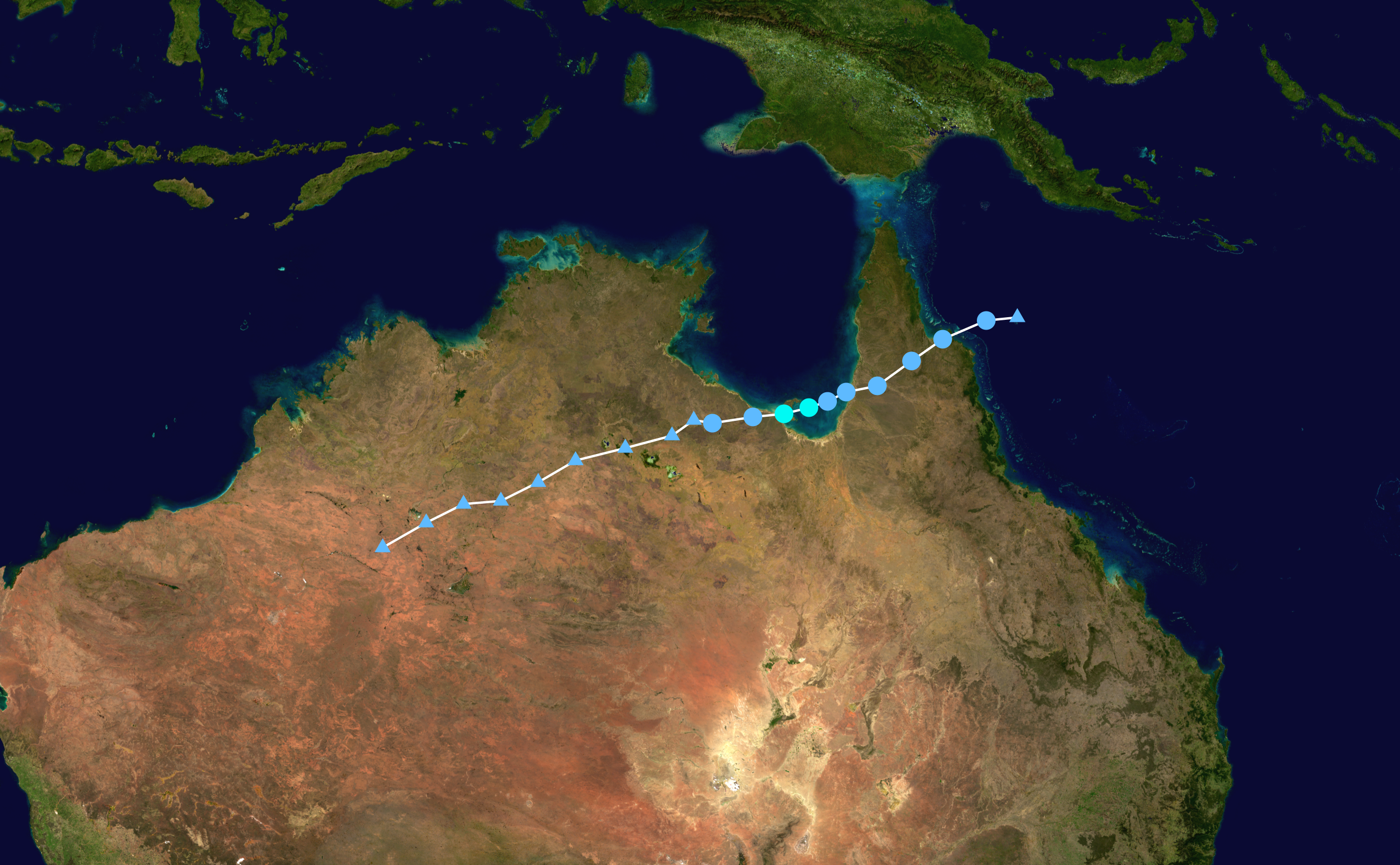
- Duration: 10 February – 15 February
- Peak intensity: 95 km/h (60 mph) (10-min); 985 hPa (mbar)

A tropical low developed on 10 February in the northern Coral Sea, within an active monsoon trough. The system developed rapidly and becoming Tropical Cyclone Fritz when it was northeast of Cooktown. Fritz moved rapidly to the west, and made landfall on the northern Queensland coast with winds of 75 km/h. The storm lost its tropical character as it crossed the Cape York Peninsula and entered the Gulf of Carpentaria on 11 February. The low reintensified over the favourable conditions in the Gulf, and reached its peak with 95 km/h winds near Mornington Island. Radar imagery showed evidence of an eye as the storm passed over the island on 12 February. It then crossed over the coast onto mainland Australian and degenerated overland. The remnant travelled over Northern Territory and Western Australia, before merging with a cold front to the south of Perth.

Cyclone Fritz brought up to 309 mm of rain to the Cairns area. This led to a number of landslides, one of which caused severe property damage in Yorkeys Knob. There was flash flooding near Innisfail when 74 mm of rain fell in one hour. Fritz uprooted a number of trees on Mornington Island, but there was no other damage there. There were no casualties from the storm.

=== Severe Tropical Cyclone Monty ===
- Category 4 severe tropical cyclone (Australian scale)
- Category 3 tropical cyclone (SSHWS)
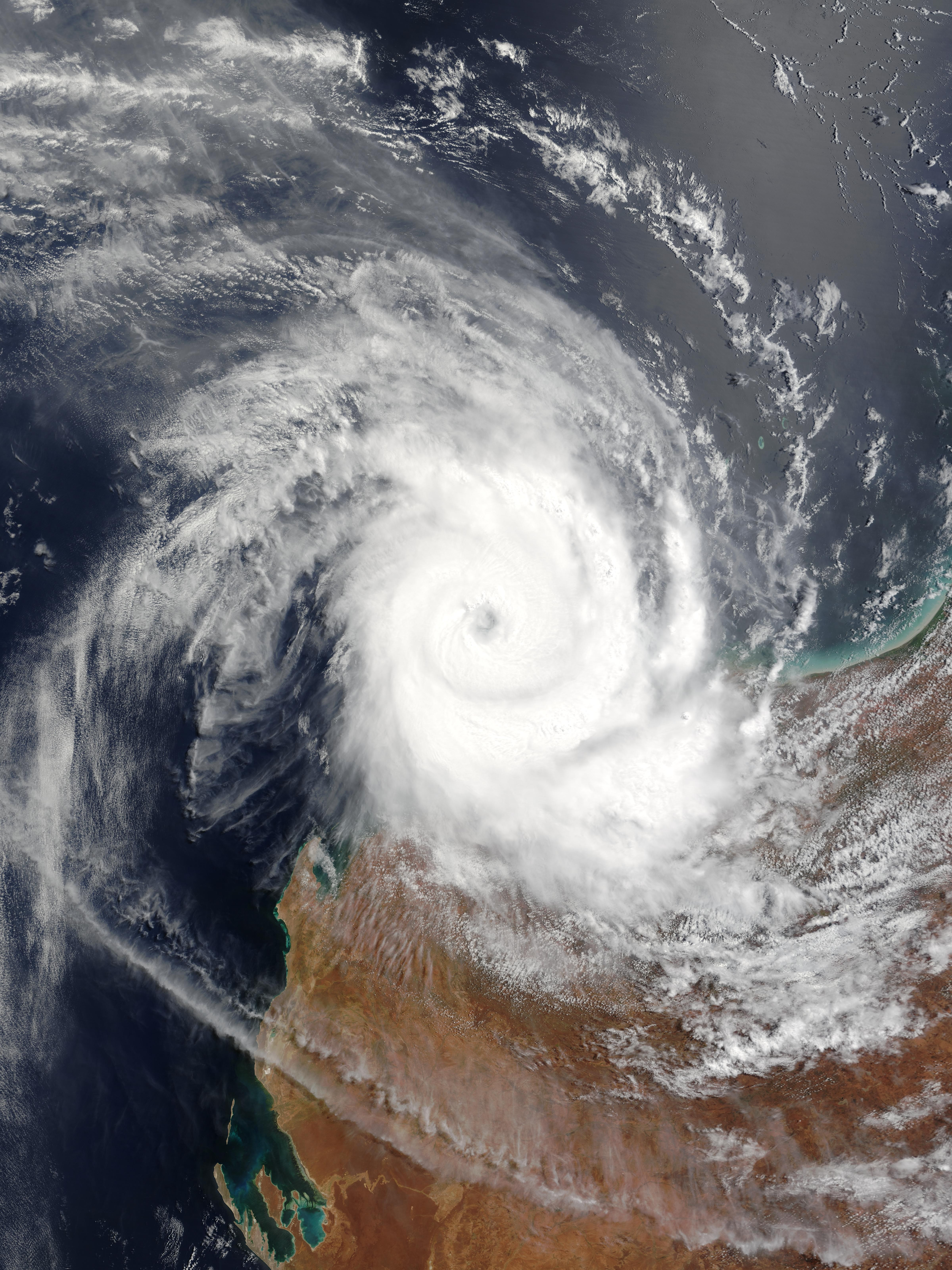
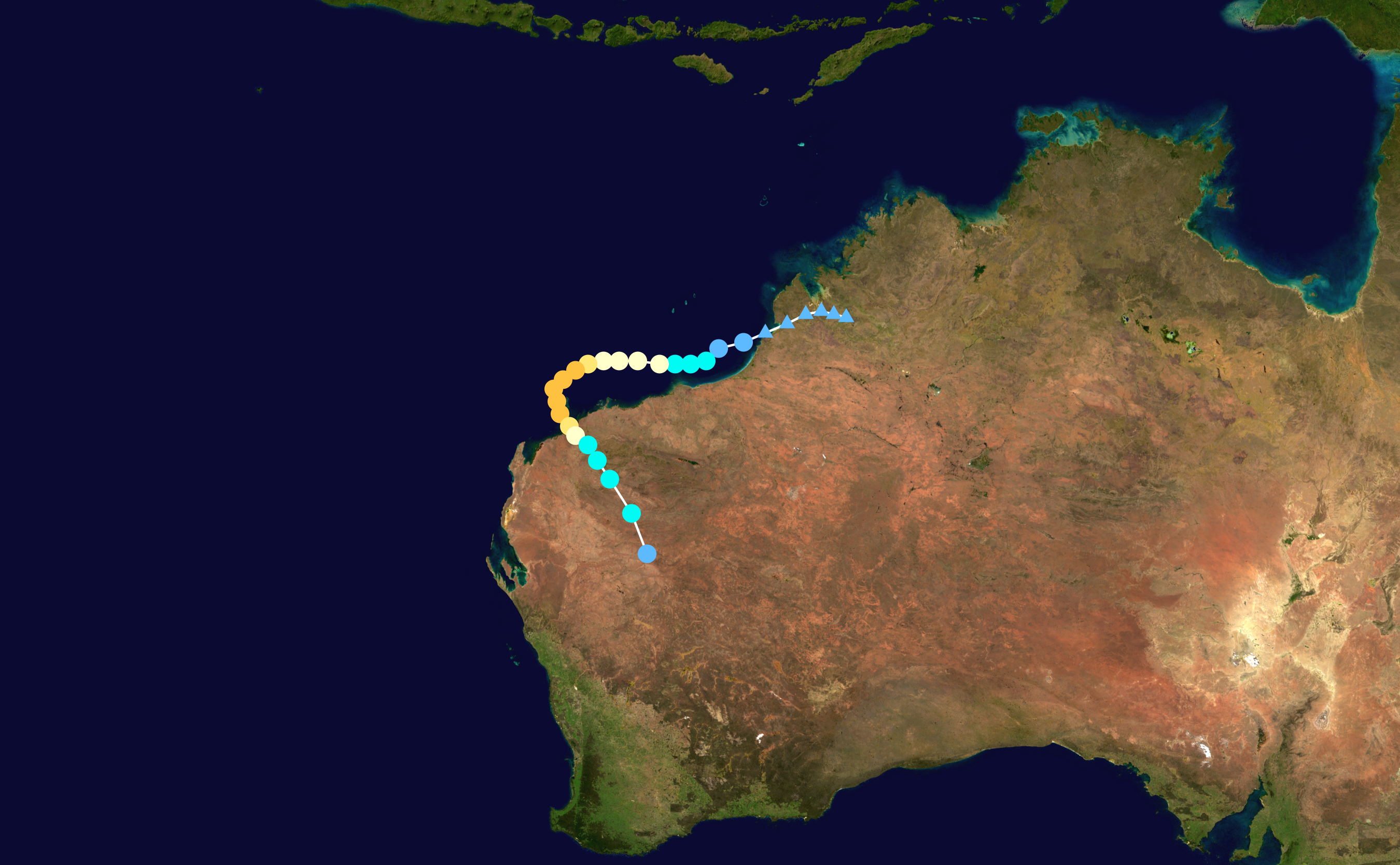
- Duration: 25 February – 3 March
- Peak intensity: 185 km/h (115 mph) (10-min); 935 hPa (mbar)

Cyclone Monty was a small cyclone that formed off the Kimberley coast around 27 February 2004. Monty then strengthened into a Category 4 cyclone as it moved parallel with the Pilbara coast. The cyclone made landfall near Mardie Station as a Category 3 cyclone on 1 March. Monty damaged several boats and caused isolated flooding.

=== Tropical Low Evan ===
- Tropical low (Australian scale)
- Tropical depression (SSHWS)
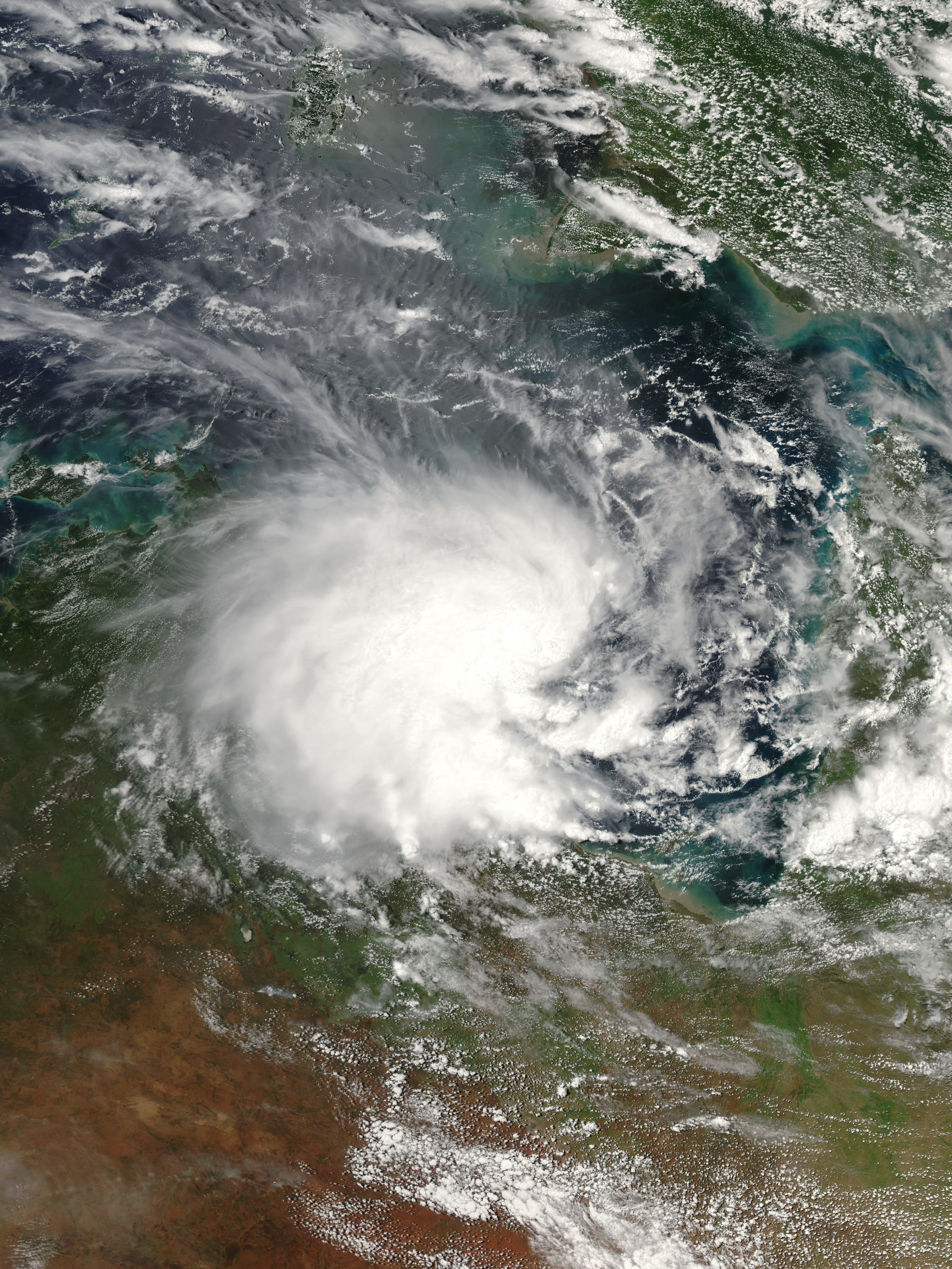
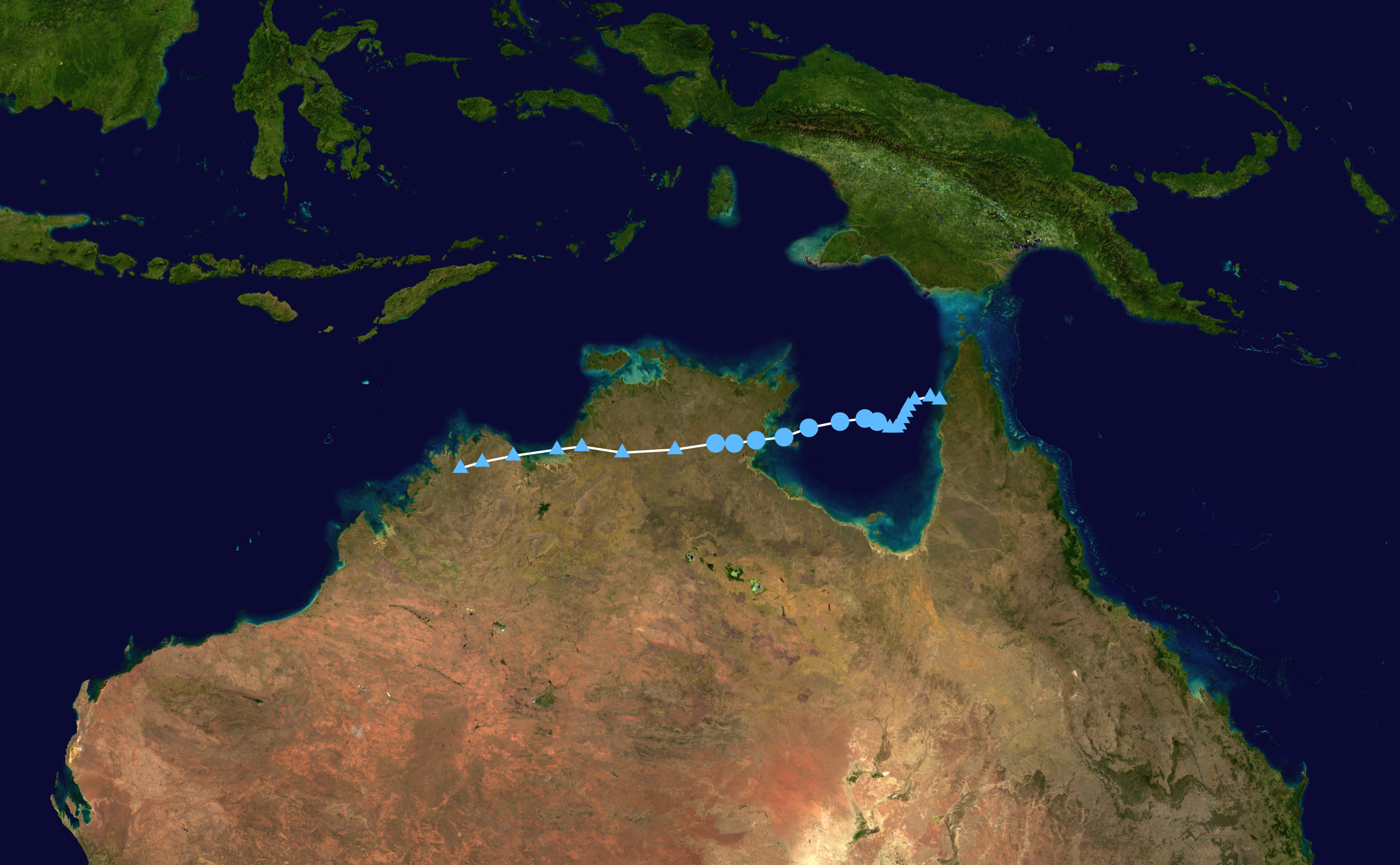
- Duration: 27 February – 4 March
- Peak intensity: 65 km/h (40 mph) (10-min); 991 hPa (mbar)

Formed on 27 February and dissipated on 4 March. Crossed Groote Eylandt and the Northern Territory mainland, causing flooding.

=== Subtropical Storm ===
- Subtropical storm (SSHWS)
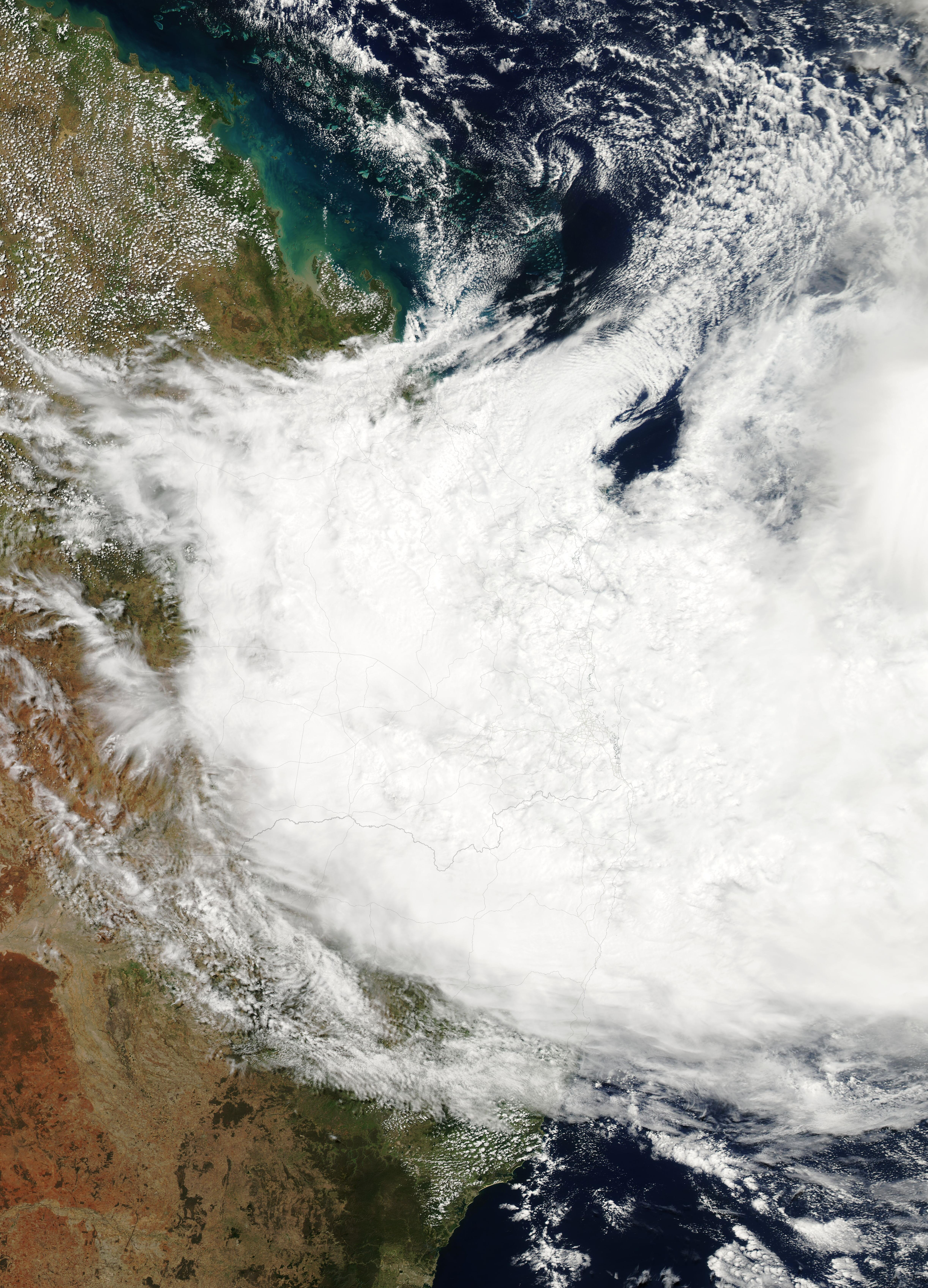
- Duration: 2 March – 5 March
- Peak intensity: Winds not specified;

A subtropical cyclone formed on 2 March and crossed the coast in southeast Queensland on 5 March, bringing heavy rain and strong winds. A storm surge caused inundation along the coasts.

=== Tropical Cyclone Nicky–Helma ===
- Category 2 tropical cyclone (Australian scale)
- Tropical storm (SSHWS)
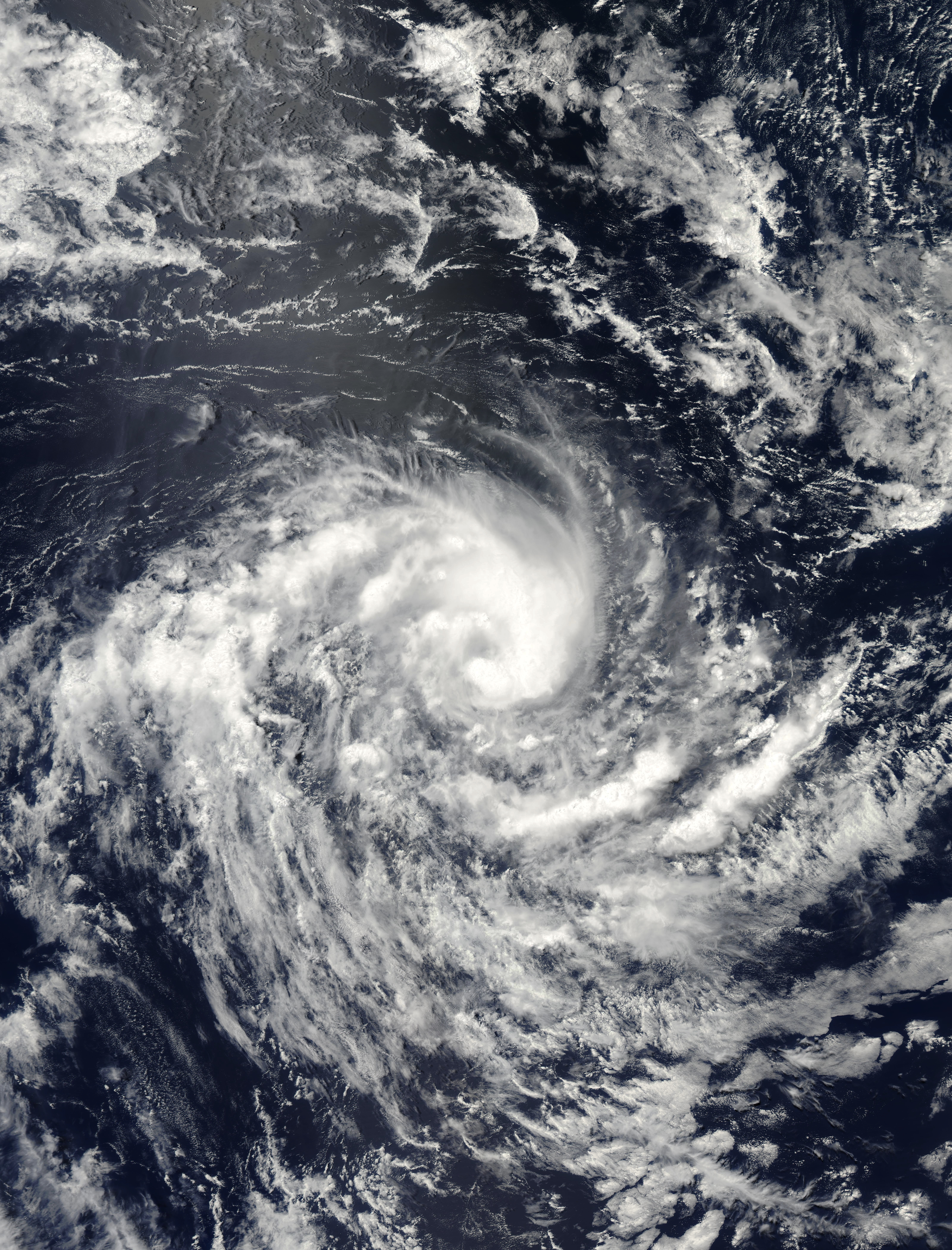
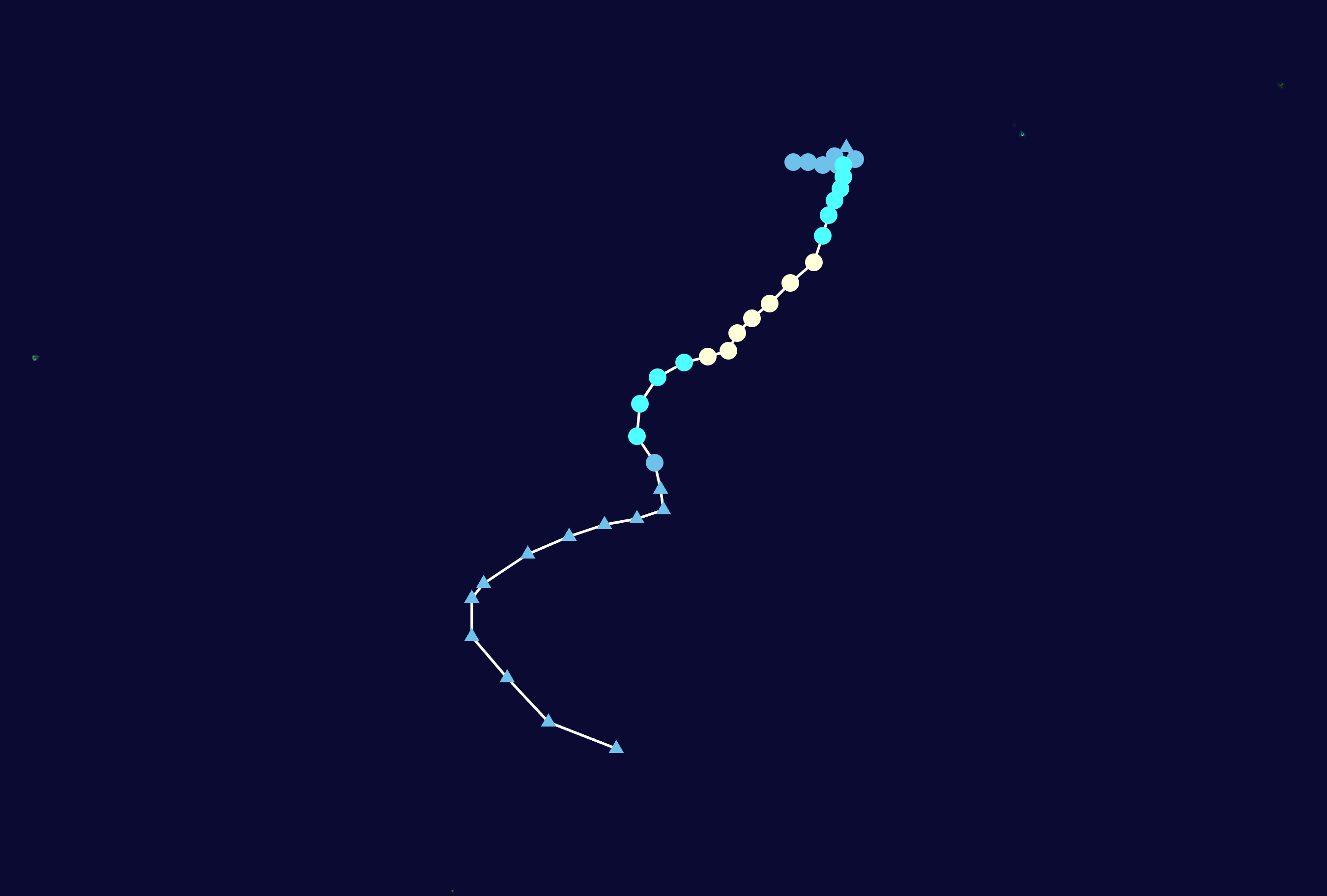
- Duration: 8 March – 10 March (Exited basin)
- Peak intensity: 95 km/h (60 mph) (10-min); 985 hPa (mbar)

Formed on 8 March, moved west of the region on 10 March, and was renamed Helma.

=== Severe Tropical Cyclone Fay ===
- Category 5 severe tropical cyclone (Australian scale)
- Category 4 tropical cyclone (SSHWS)
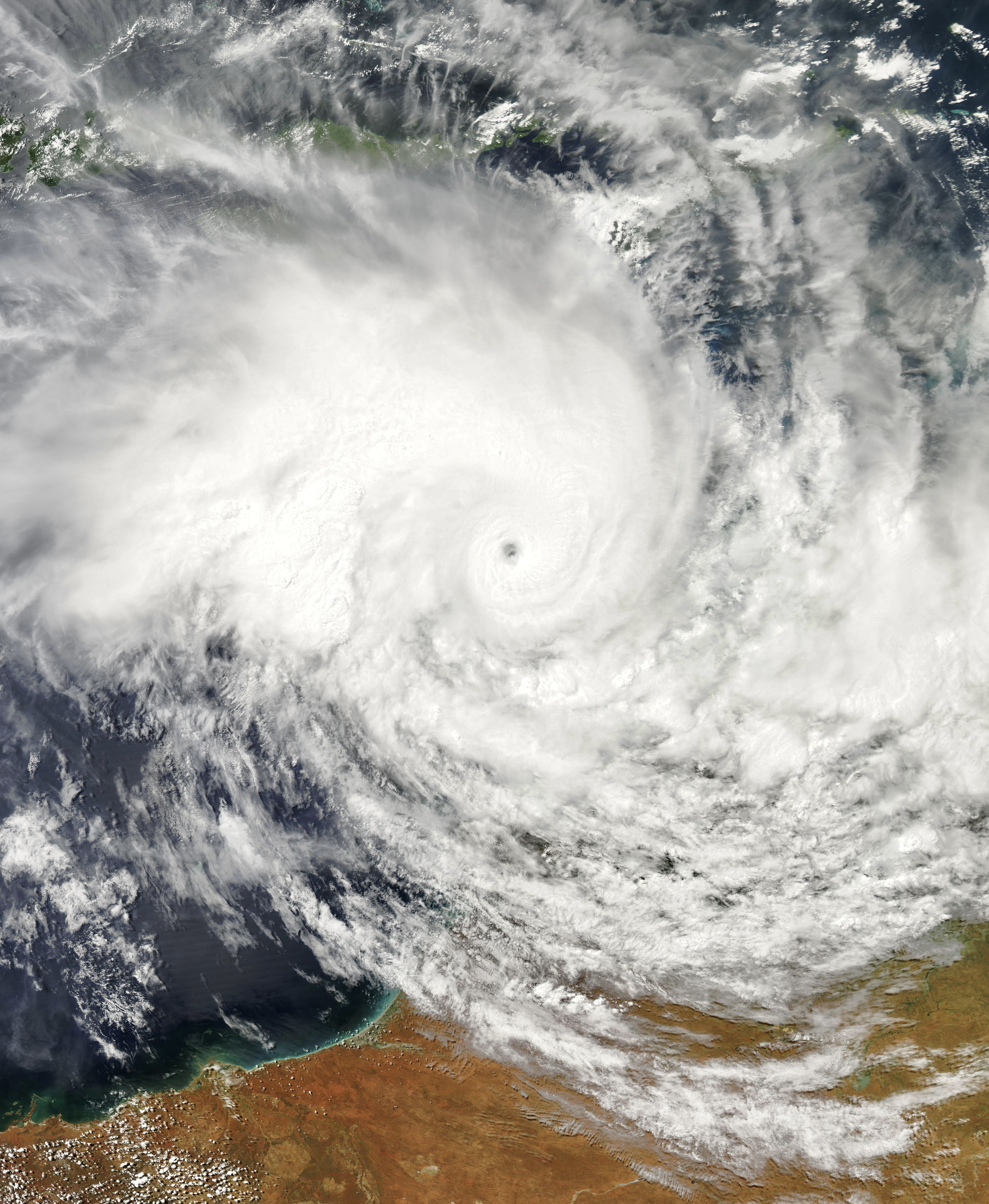
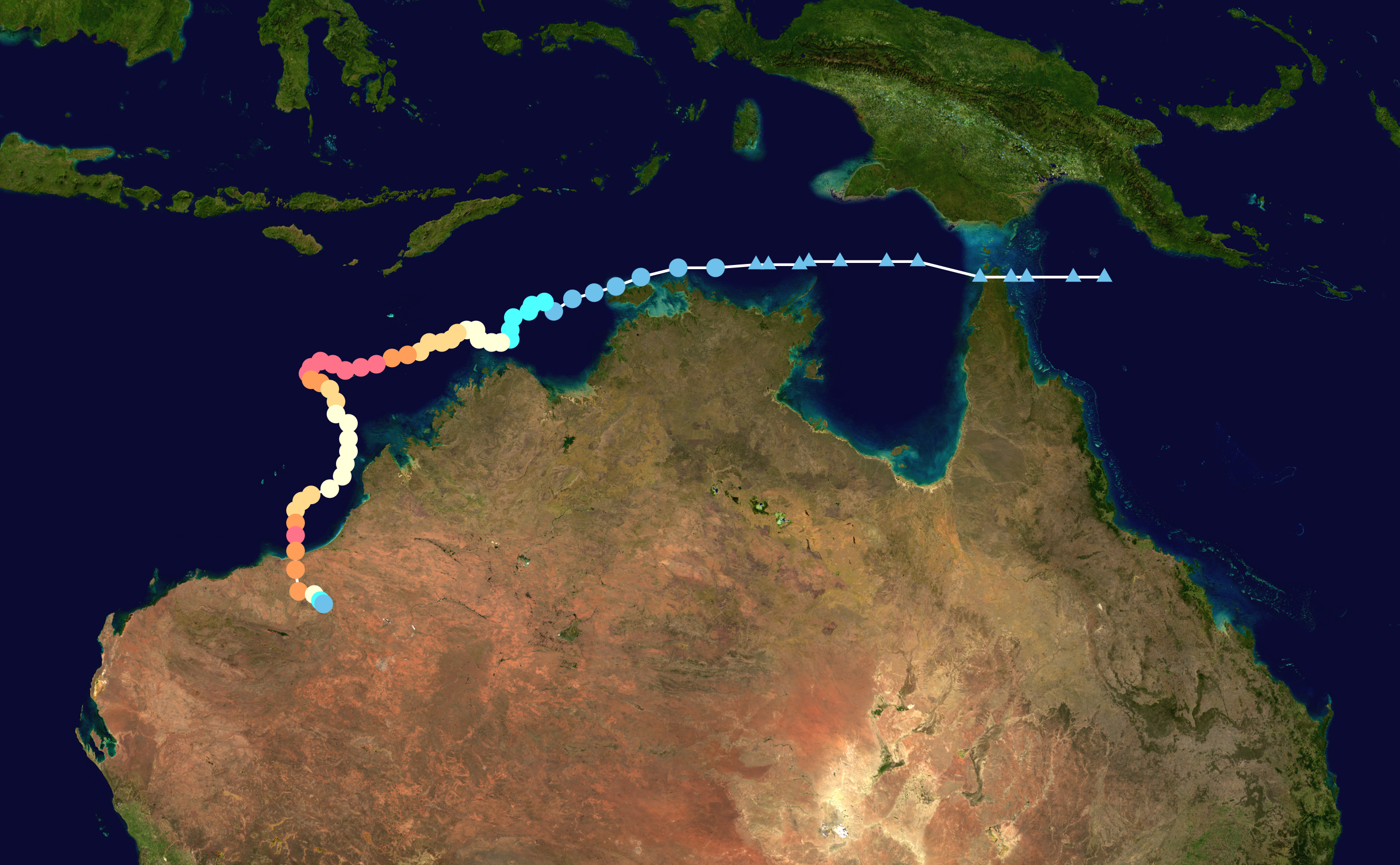
- Duration: 12 March – 28 March
- Peak intensity: 215 km/h (130 mph) (10-min); 910 hPa (mbar)

A low-pressure system formed in the Gulf of Carpentaria and moved westward into the Timor Sea; it was named Tropical Cyclone Fay on 16 March. Fay was 400 km north of Wyndham and 330 kilometres west northwest of Darwin. There were reports along the Kimberley Coast of gale-force winds. On 21 March, Cyclone Fay intensified even further as the storm approached Scott Reef where significant damage occurred. Looping back towards the Kimberley coast, Fay – now a Category 3 system – approached to within 90 km of Broome on 25 March, before turning to the south-west. Broome experienced strong winds with gale-force gusts, some heavy rain and heavy seas but escaped serious damage.

Fay then headed further away from the coast on the 25th before resuming a general southerly track on the 26th. Fay crossed the Pilbara coast between the pastoral stations of Pardoo and Wallal between 8 am and 9 am WST on 27 March as a Category 4 storm with estimated maximum wind gusts of around 235 km/h near the center.

The cyclone weakened as it moved inland. Little wind damage was reported from the storm despite its intensity as it made landfall in a remote part of the WA coast and consequently only impacted sparsely populated pastoral and mining areas. As the system passed close to the Yarrie mine its translation speed reduced and some 200 workers were locked down for 8 hours in two squash courts as accommodation units were overturned, water tanks "shredded" and power lines cut. Fay appears to have weakened below cyclone strength on Sunday evening (28 March) between Nullagine and Telfer.

Cyclone Fay caused extensive flooding and considerable damage. However, no deaths were recorded.

=== Tropical Cyclone Grace ===
- Category 2 tropical cyclone (Australian scale)
- Tropical storm (SSHWS)
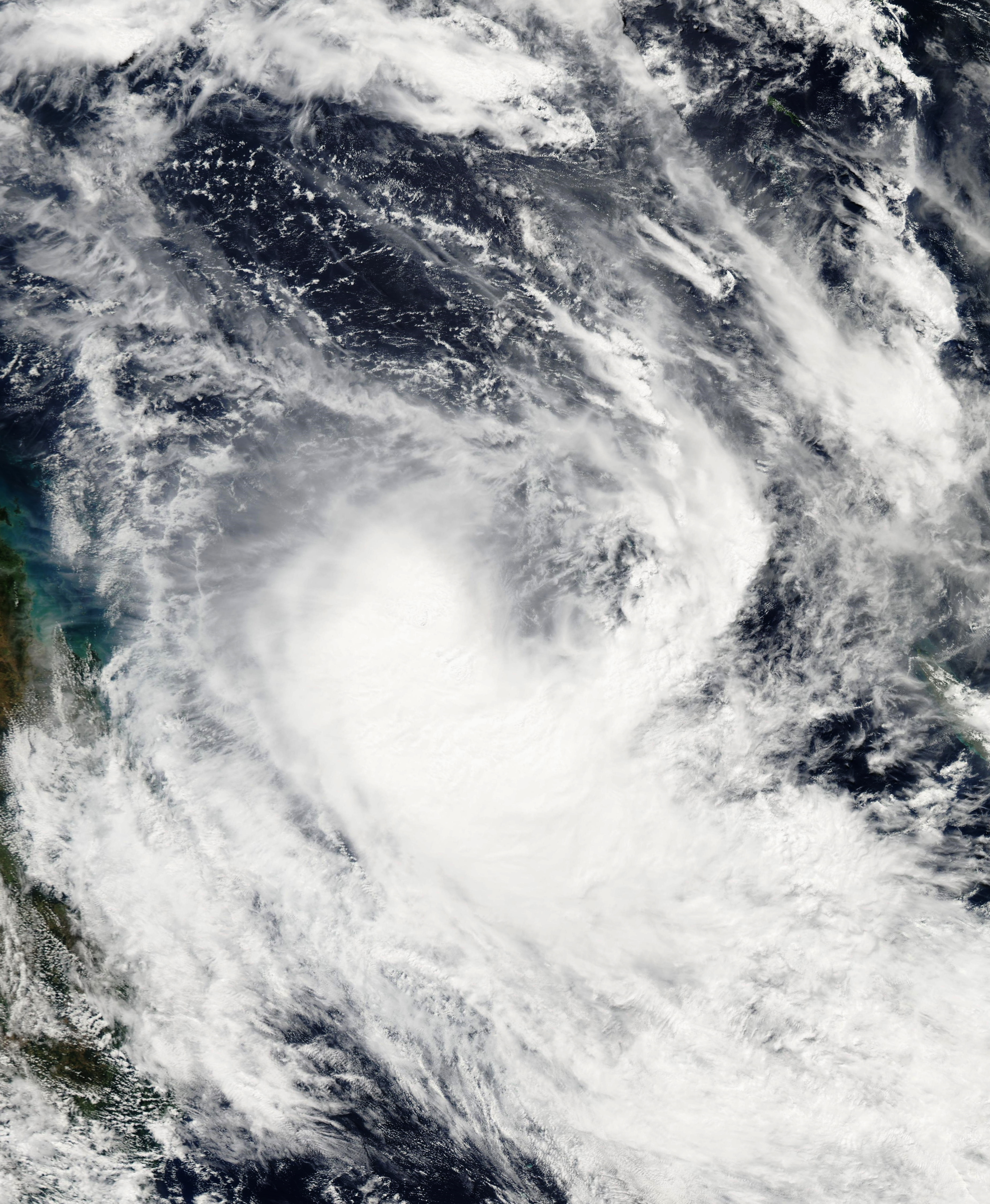
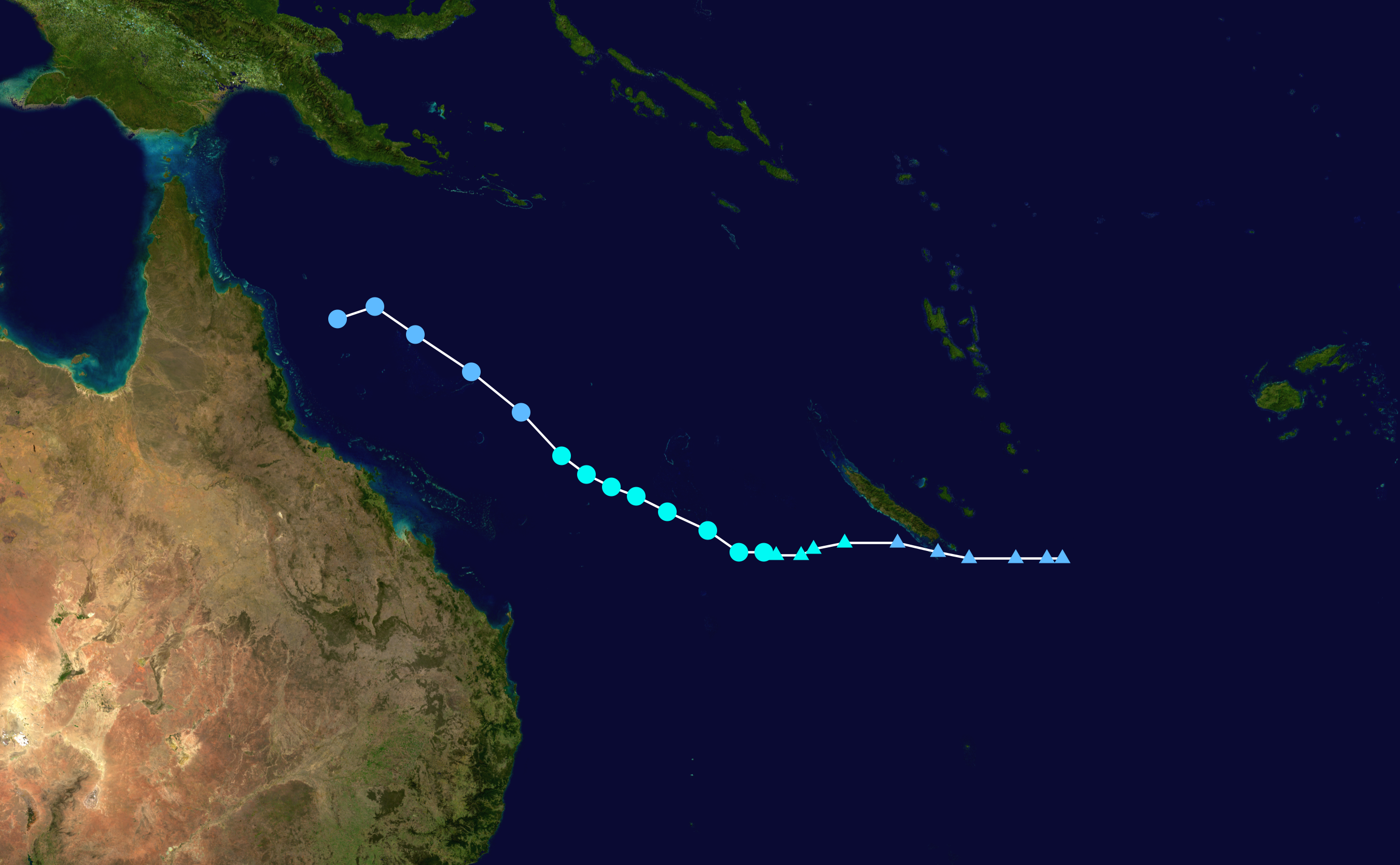
- Duration: 20 March – 23 March
- Peak intensity: 95 km/h (60 mph) (10-min); 985 hPa (mbar)

Grace is mostly remembered for its effects prior to reaching cyclone status rather than during its life as an officially named tropical cyclone. A multi-centred tropical low formed adjacent to the north Queensland tropical coast near Cooktown as early as 20 March within a very active monsoon trough that stretched across the northern Coral Sea and Cape York Peninsula toward New Caledonia, and initially had a subtropical appearance. Over the ensuing days, the northernmost circulation became dominant and moved east to the southeast of the equatorward ridge. By 21/1820 UTC it became the second named tropical cyclone of Queensland's and was named Grace.

Grace moved toward the southeast at 15 to 20 knots (37 km/h). This general motion was to continue for the remainder of the cyclone's life. Grace peaked in intensity at 985 hPa with maximum sustained winds of 50 knots (93 km/h) near 20.3S/155.9E at 22/0000 UTC. This intensity was maintained for approximately 6 hours. Thereafter, Grace began to undergo extratropical transition with an increasingly asymmetric wind field due to a squeeze with a surface ridge to the south. Grace rapidly lost its entire upper-level structure and was downgraded at 23/1800 UTC from tropical cyclone status when located approximately 400 nautical miles (740 km) east-northeast of Sandy Cape (23.6S/162.3E). The remnant surface wind field of the system meandered to the east and then to the east-northeast over the following days, producing a very broad area of gales to its south through the Tasman Sea. The highest three-day rainfall amounts for Grace was 759 mm from Topaz, which received 372 mm in 24 hours. The strongest winds from the mainland were from Low Isle at 18/1311 UTC when gusts reached 50 knots (93 km/h). Cape Moreton at 21 March 2004 2230 UTC received gusts to 54 knots (100 km/h). Widespread flooding and damage to roads and property along the far north Queensland coast, mainly between Cooktown and Cairns. Winds and waves brought tide levels above the highest tides of the year and this was particularly evident at Cooktown. Floodwaters closed all major roads into Cairns. A large section of one lane of the Captain Cook Highway north of Cairns collapsed after a landslide consisting of nearly 20 metres of rock and boulders the size of cars destroyed the ocean-side road. The scenic coastal highway and link between Cairns and Port Douglas was closed for several days. Residents were evacuated from the Whitfield range area due to landslides. An estimated $20,000,000 (US) damage to the Cairns region is attributed to pre-cyclone Grace. There were no casualties associated with Tropical Cyclone Grace. In New Caledonia, further strong winds, heavy rains and flooding were experienced. A massive oil slick threatened a popular tourist beach in New Caledonia. Officials in the French Pacific territory put up barriers around the island of Amedee, which was threatened by a toxic oil slick, estimated to cover an area of 20 square kilometres. They said the oil had come from a boat wrecked several decades ago on a coral reef off South Province.

=== Severe Tropical Cyclone Oscar–Itseng ===
- Category 4 severe tropical cyclone (Australian scale)
- Category 4 tropical cyclone (SSHWS)
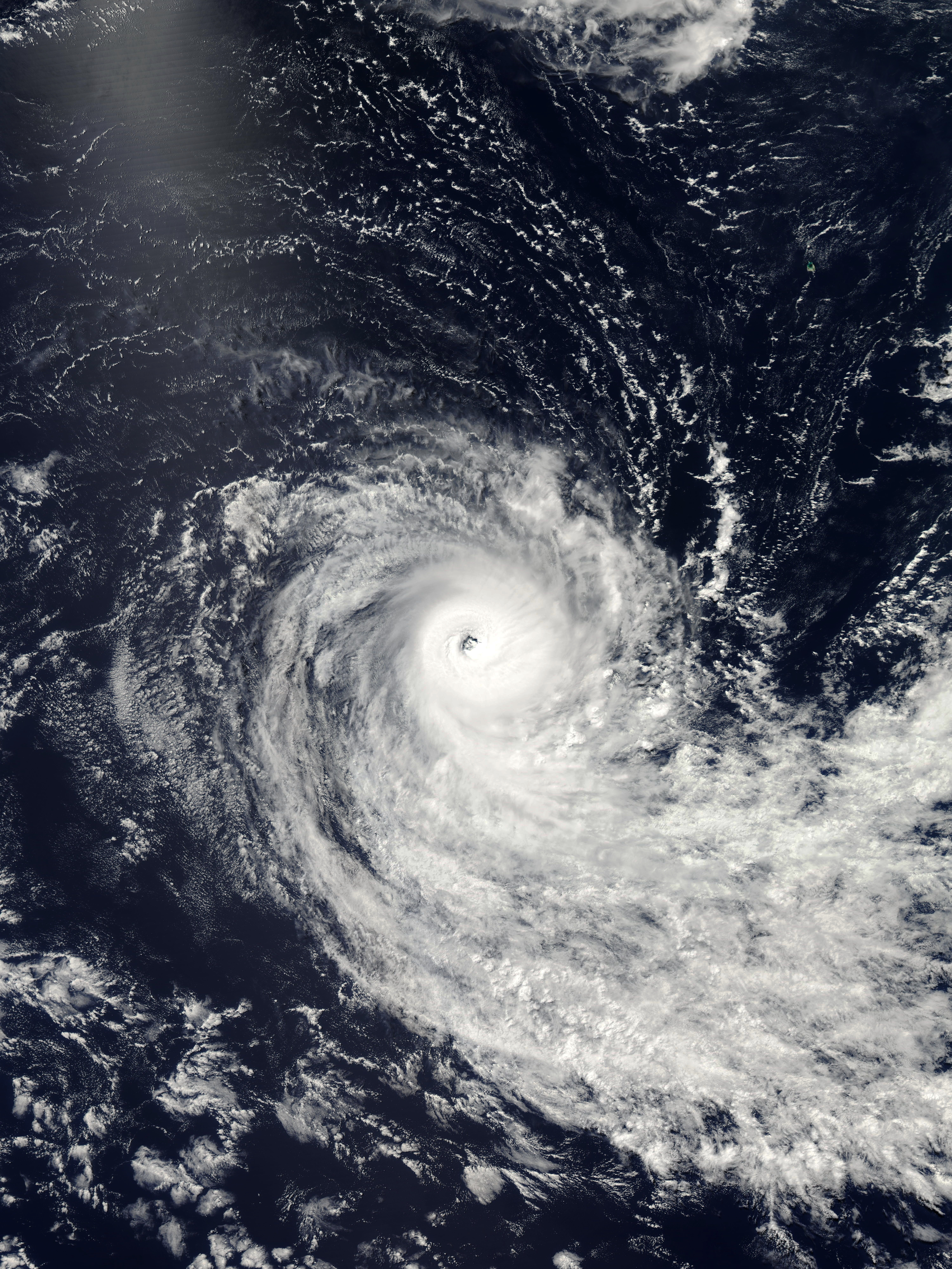
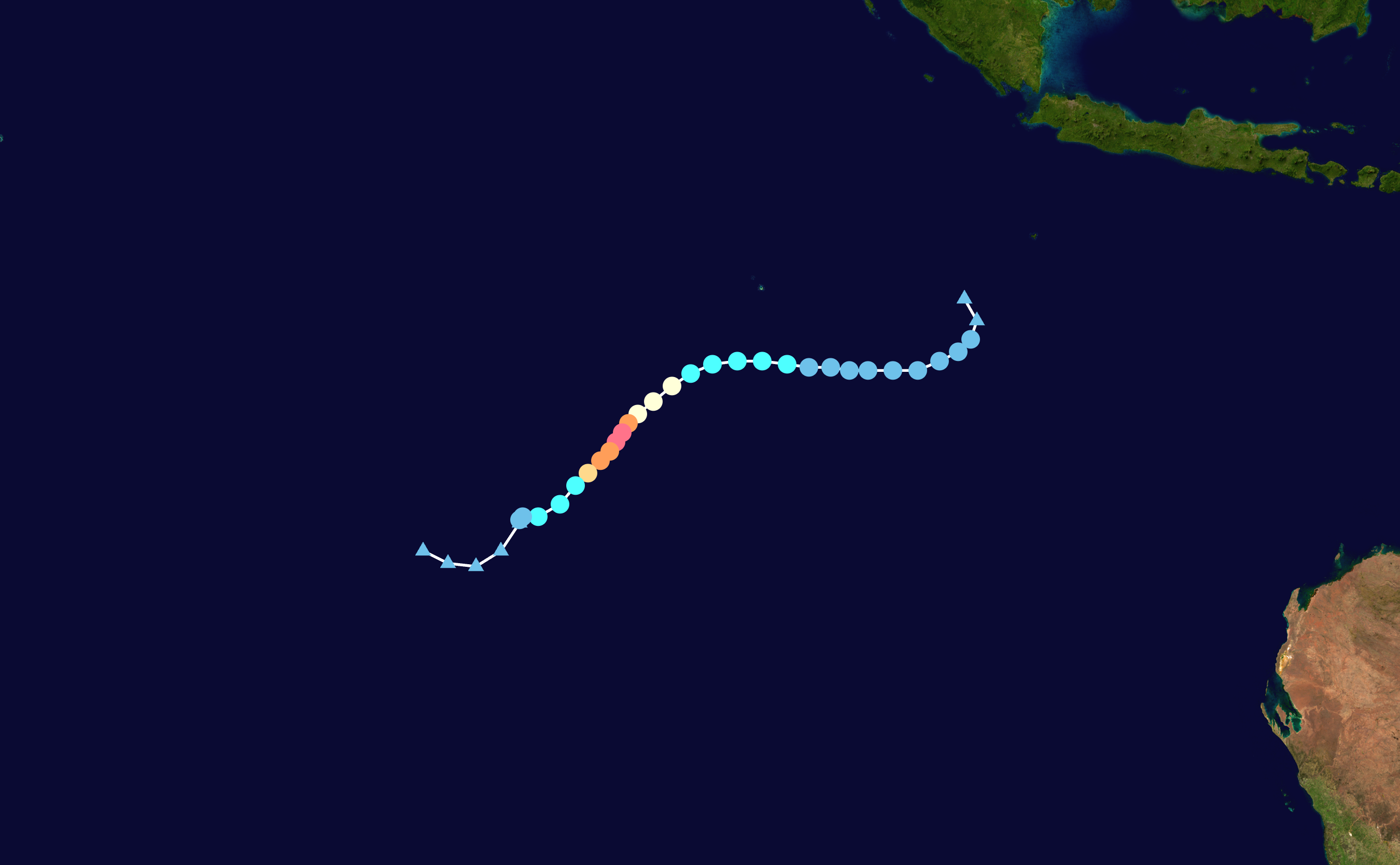
- Duration: 21 March – 27 March (Exited basin)
- Peak intensity: 165 km/h (105 mph) (10-min); 940 hPa (mbar)

Formed on 21 March, moved out of the region on 27 March into South-West Indian Ocean region, renaming to Itseng.

=== Other systems ===
During 20 December, Tropical Disturbance 02F was last noted by the FMS, as it moved into the region from the South Pacific basin about 665 km (415 mi) to the northwest of Honiara in the Solomon Islands. Tropical Disturbance 04F was first noted by the FMS within a broad area of low pressure during 29 December, while it was located on the border with the South Pacific basin, about 100 km (60 mi) to the south of Honiara in the Solomon Islands. The system was located in a moderate area of vertical windshear and was poorly organised with atmospheric convection confined to the system's eastern semicircle. The system subsequently moved south-eastwards and remained poorly organised, before it was last noted by the FMS later that day while it was located to the south of San Cristobal Island.

== Storm names ==
TCWC Perth

- Jana
- Ken
- Linda
- Monty
- Nicky
- Oscar

TCWC Darwin

- Debbie
- Evan
- Fay

TCWC Brisbane

- Fritz
- Grace

== Season effects ==
This is a table of all of the storms that have formed in the 2003–04 Australian region cyclone season. It includes their duration, names, landfall(s)–denoted by bold location names – damages, and death totals. Damage and deaths include totals while the storm was extratropical, a wave, or a low, and all of the damage figures are in 2004 AUD and USD.

Name	Dates	Peak intensity			Areas affected	Damage (USD)	Deaths	Ref(s).
Name	Dates	Category	Wind speed	Pressure	Areas affected	Damage (USD)	Deaths	Ref(s).
Jana	6–12 December	Category 3 severe tropical cyclone	155 km/h (100 mph)	950 hPa (28.05 inHg)	None	None	None	
Debbie	16–23 December	Category 3 severe tropical cyclone	120 km/h (75 mph)	970 hPa (28.64 inHg)	Papua New Guinia, Northern Territory	None	None	
02F	20 December 2003	Tropical Disturbance	Not specified	1000 hPa (29.53 inHg)	Solomon Islands	None	None	
04F	29 December 2003	Tropical Disturbance	Not specified	1004 hPa (29.65 inHg)	Solomon Islands	None	None	
Ken	1 – 6 January	Tropical low	75 km/h (45 mph)	992 hPa (29.29 inHg)	Western Australia	None	None	
Linda	28 January – 1 February 2004	Category 2 tropical cyclone	95 km/h (60 mph)	985 hPa (29.09 inHg)	None	None	None	
Fritz	10–15 February	Category 2 tropical cyclone	95 km/h (60 mph)	985 hPa (29.09 inHg)	Queensland, Northern Territory	None	None	
Monty	25 February – 3 March	Category 4 severe tropical cyclone	185 km/h (115 mph)	935 hPa (27.61 inHg)	Western Australia	Minor	None	
Evan	27 February – 4 March	Tropical low	65 km/h (40 mph)	991 hPa (29.26 inHg)	Northern Australia	Unknown	Unknown	
Nicky	8–10 March	Category 2 tropical cyclone	95 km/h (60 mph)	985 hPa (29.09 inHg)	None	None	None	
Fay	12–28 March	Category 5 severe tropical cyclone	215 km/h (130 mph)	910 hPa (26.87 inHg)	Northern Territory, Western Australia	Minimal	None	
Grace	20–23 March	Category 2 tropical cyclone	95 km/h (60 mph)	985 hPa (29.09 inHg)	Queensland	$20 million	None	
Oscar	21–27 March	Category 4 severe tropical cyclone	165 km/h (105 mph)	940 hPa (27.76 inHg)	None	None	None	
Season aggregates
11 systems	6 December – 27 March		215 km/h (130 mph)	910 hPa (26.87 inHg)		$20,000,000	0	

== See also ==
- Tropical cyclones in 2004
- List of Southern Hemisphere tropical cyclone seasons
- Atlantic hurricane seasons 2003, 2004
- Pacific hurricane seasons 2003, 2004
- Pacific typhoon seasons 2003, 2004
- North Indian cyclone season 2003, 2004
