= List of storms named Narelle =

The name Narelle has been used for two tropical cyclones in the Australian region.

- Cyclone Narelle (2013) – a Category 4 severe tropical cyclone that affected East Timor and Western Australia.
- Cyclone Narelle (2026) – a Category 5 severe tropical cyclone that made four landfalls around Australia, but mostly affected Far North Queensland and Western Australia.

The name Narelle was retired in the Australian region following the 2025–26 cyclone season.
