= Cyclone Narelle (2013) =

Category 4 Australian region cyclone in 2013

Severe Tropical Cyclone Narelle
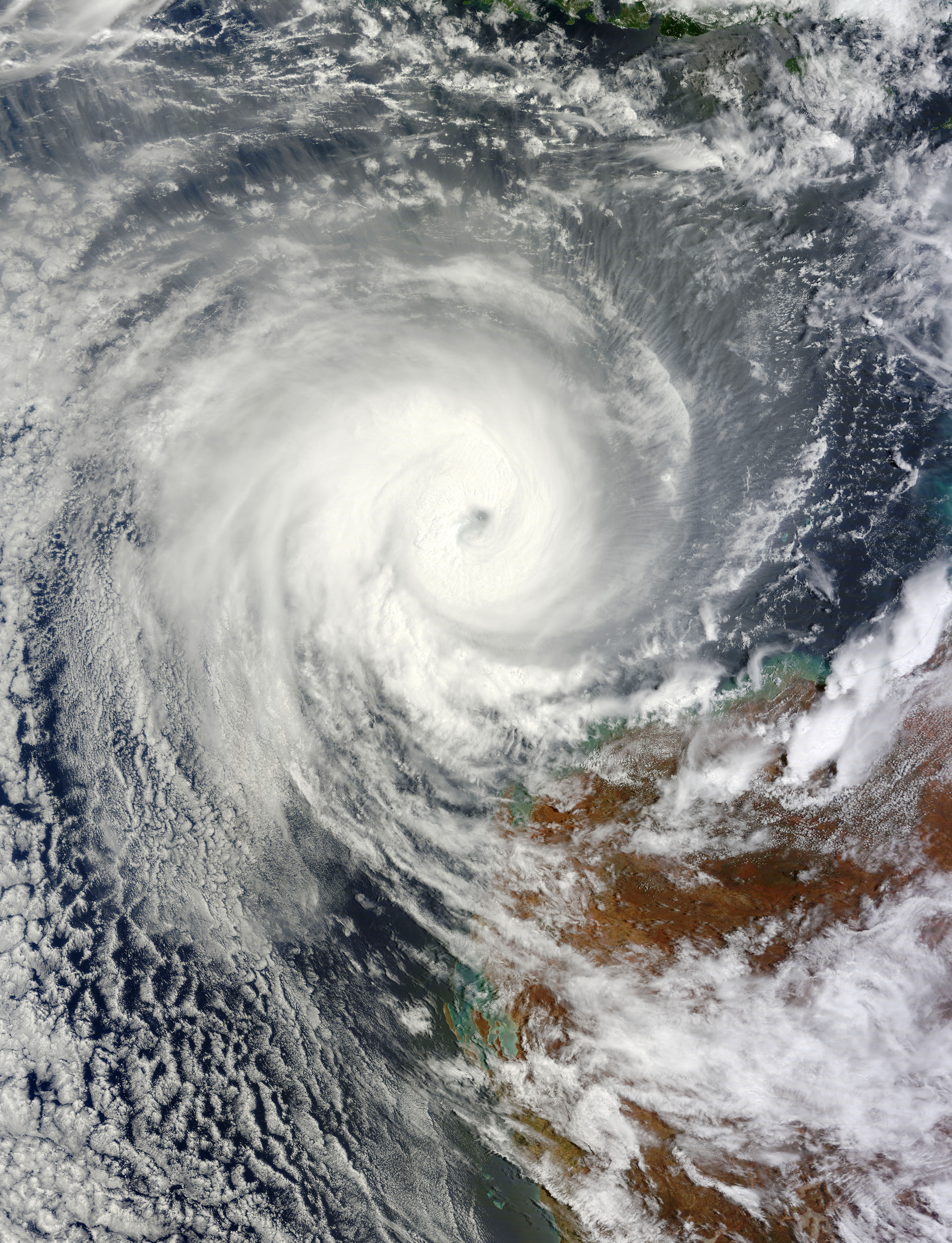
- Cyclone Narelle near peak intensity on 11 January

Meteorological history
- Formed: 5 January 2013
- Dissipated: 15 January 2013

Category 4 severe tropical cyclone
- 10-minute sustained (BOM)
- Highest winds: 195 km/h (120 mph)
- Highest gusts: 270 km/h (165 mph)
- Lowest pressure: 930 hPa (mbar); 27.46 inHg

Category 4-equivalent tropical cyclone
- 1-minute sustained (SSHWS/JTWC)
- Highest winds: 220 km/h (140 mph)
- Lowest pressure: 933 hPa (mbar); 27.55 inHg

Overall effects
- Fatalities: 14 direct
- Missing: 17
- Damage: $74,000 (2013 USD)
- Areas affected: East Timor, Indonesia, Western Australia, South Australia, Tasmania
- IBTrACS
- Part of the 2012–13 Australian region cyclone season

Severe Tropical Cyclone Narelle was a powerful Category 4 tropical cyclone in early January 2013 that brought light rains to areas in South Australia suffering from a drought and heat wave. On 4 January, a tropical low pressure developed within a monsoon trough over the Timor Sea. Over the following several days, the system gradually tracked westward and intensified, being classified as Tropical Cyclone Narelle on 8 January. Turning southward into a region of low wind shear, Narelle intensified into a severe tropical cyclone on 9 January. Over the following two days, the cyclone's structure fluctuated, temporarily featuring an eye, before it maintained its organisation and intensified further on 11 January. The storm attained its peak intensity later on 11 January as a Category 4 cyclone with winds of 195 km/h (121 mph). (Note: All sustained wind speeds are based on ten-minute standards unless otherwise stated.) The following day, Narelle passed approximately 330 km (205 mi) northwest of Exmouth as it moved on a south-southwesterly course. The system steadily weakened and ultimately fell below tropical cyclone strength on 15 January well to the west of Geraldton.

Early in the storm's existence, Narelle brought strong winds, heavy rain, and high winds to many areas in Indonesia. More than 10,000 homes were flooded and many others were damaged by thunderstorms. A total of 14 people were killed by the storm, and 17 others were listed as missing. In Western Australia, scattered strong thunderstorms caused minor damage and produced a possible tornado.

== Meteorological history ==
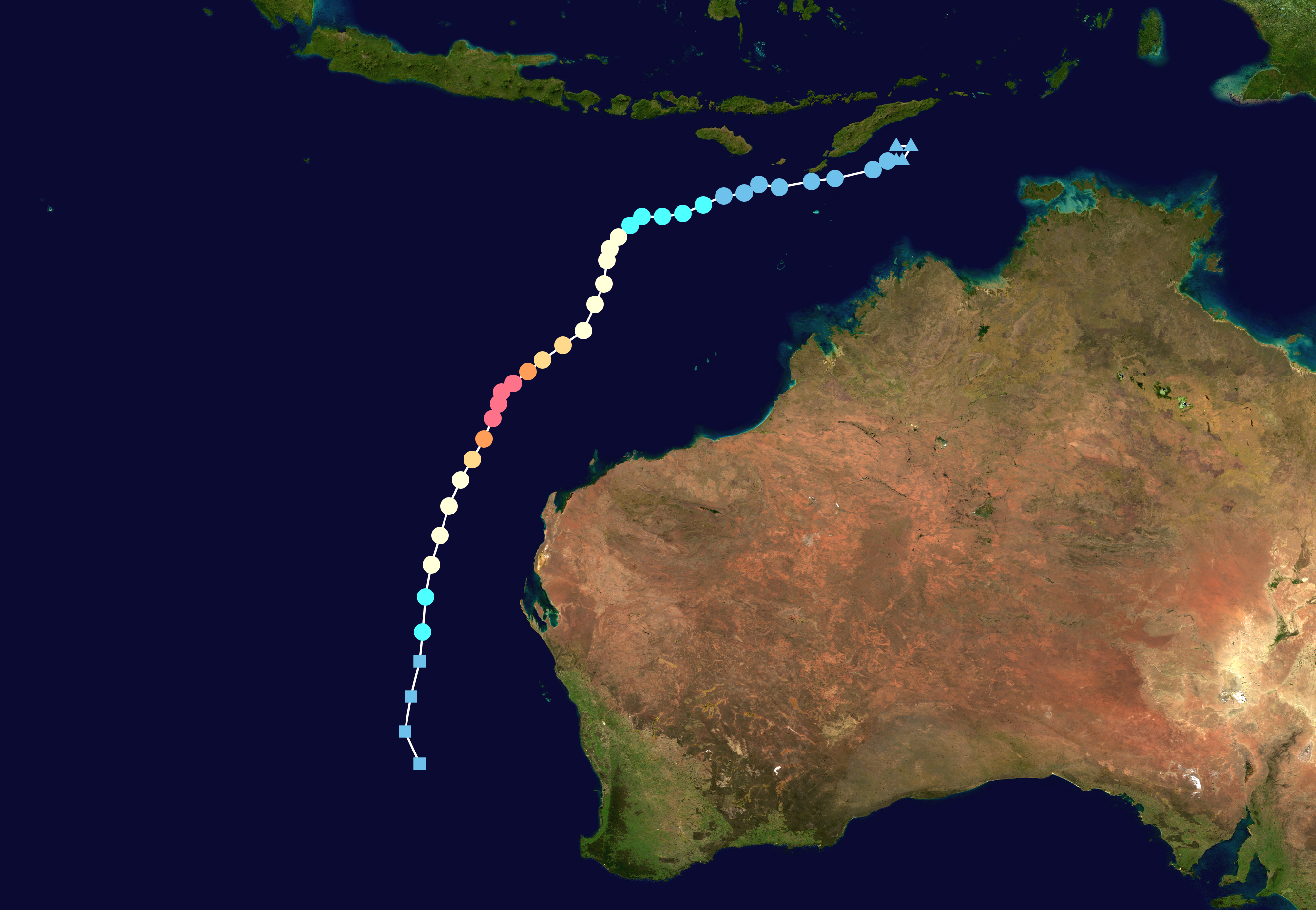
Map plotting the storm's track and intensity, according to the Saffir–Simpson scale Map key Saffir–Simpson scale Tropical depression (≤38 mph, ≤62 km/h) Tropical storm (39–73 mph, 63–118 km/h) Category 1 (74–95 mph, 119–153 km/h) Category 2 (96–110 mph, 154–177 km/h) Category 3 (111–129 mph, 178–208 km/h) Category 4 (130–156 mph, 209–251 km/h) Category 5 (≥157 mph, ≥252 km/h) Unknown Storm type Tropical cyclone Subtropical cyclone Extratropical cyclone, remnant low, tropical disturbance, or monsoon depression

On 4 January, a weak area of low pressure developed within a monsoon trough near Timor. The following day, the Joint Typhoon Warning Center (JTWC) began monitoring the system for possible development into a tropical cyclone. (Note: The Joint Typhoon Warning Center is a joint United States Navy – United States Air Force task force that issues tropical cyclone warnings for the western Pacific Ocean and other regions.) Traveling westward, the system was forecast to intensify as it moved into an area highly favouring tropical cyclogenesis with very warm waters (with sea surface temperatures of 30 to 31 °C (86 to 88 °F)) and low wind shear. Additionally, a nearby anticyclone provided good outflow for the system. Over the following two days, deep convection gradually built around the low and on 7 January, the Tropical Cyclone Warning Centre (TCWC) in Darwin designated the system as Tropical Low 05U, at which time the storm was situated roughly 135 km (85 mi) south-southeast of Sumba, Indonesia. (Note: The Bureau of Meteorology is one of the official Tropical Cyclone Warning Centers for the Australian tropical cyclone region.) By this time, the system was tracking west-southwestward around a subtropical ridge, which would dictate the track of the storm for the remainder of its existence. Later on 7 January, the JTWC issued a Tropical Cyclone Formation Alert for the system, indicating that further development of the low into a significant tropical cyclone was anticipated. Just seven hours after this, the JTWC classified the system as a tropical storm and began issuing advisories.

Through the morning of 8 January, weak wind shear hindered development of the system. After enough convection wrapped around the centre of circulation, the BoM classified the low as Tropical Cyclone Narelle, the second named storm in the western region during the 2012–13 season. Shortly thereafter, intensification quickened as a central dense overcast formed and prominent banding features consolidated. Following the development of an eye early on 9 January, the Bureau of Meteorology upgraded Narelle to a severe tropical cyclone, with winds estimated at 120 km/h (75 mph). Over the following day, Narelle's intensity levelled out as it encountered moderate wind shear. Once the shear relaxed, the system resumed strengthening. With conditions more favourable, Narelle redeveloped an eye and its outflow improved. Late on 11 January, Narelle is estimated to have attained its peak intensity with winds of 195 km/h (121 mph) and a barometric pressure of 930 mbar (hPa; 27.46 inHg). Operationally, the storm was believed to have been slightly stronger, peaking as a Category 5 cyclone on the Australian scale. It was not until a post-storm assessment that the Bureau of Meteorology found Narelle to have been a weaker system at its peak. At the same time, the JTWC assessed the storm to have attained one-minute sustained winds of 215 km/h (134 mph), ranking it as a Category 4-equivalent cyclone on the Saffir–Simpson hurricane scale.

Hours after Narelle reached peak intensity, increasing wind shear caused the storm's eyewall to erode and the outflow to become somewhat restricted. By the afternoon of 12 January, the storm's structure had significantly degraded, with the eye no longer apparent and a marked decrease in cold cloud tops. Later that day, the cyclone made its closest approach to Western Australia, passing approximately 330 km (205 mi) northwest of Exmouth. Despite shear eventually lightening up, the storm's southerly course brought it over cooler waters, preventing restrengthening. Most of the deep convection shifted to the western side of Narelle's circulation, though its centre remained well defined. By the evening of 13 January, the storm had weakened below severe tropical cyclone strength. Rapid weakening ensued on 14 January, as the effects of cooler waters and dry air caused the deep convection to dissociate into an area of shallow stratocumulus clouds. Narelle failed to redevelop deep convection and weakened below tropical cyclone status early on 15 January, prompting the Bureau of Meteorology to issue its final bulletin on the cyclone. The system was last observed about 500 km (310 mi) west of Geraldton, where it continued southward away from Australia.

== Preparations and impact ==
=== Indonesia ===
On 9 January, the MV Emeline cargo vessel sank off the coast of Selayar Islands. Of the 17 crewmen, 6 were rescued and 11 others remained missing as of 16 January. Another vessel, the MV Angle, became stranded near West Lombok Regency. By 10 January, Narelle brought strong winds, heavy rains, and rough seas to the province of Bali in Indonesia. Residents and tourists were warned of waves up to 5 m (16 ft). Ferry service between Bali, West Nusa Tenggara, and Java was suspended, isolating residents in Nusa Penida, Nusa Lembongan, and Nusa Ceningan. Winds from the storm downed many trees and caused severe damage to structures across Bali, especially in the capital city of Denpasar. In Selemadeg Village, one person died after a tree fell on her. Trees and billboards were downed across Jakarta, and three homes were damaged. Flooding in the region closed several roads, leading to traffic delays more than 6 km (3.7 mi) long. In Banten, heavy rains caused four major rivers in the province to overflow their banks, leading to flooding in 33 districts. A total of 10,470 homes across the province were inundated, and four people were killed. In all, 14 people were killed and 6 others were listed as missing.

=== Western Australia ===
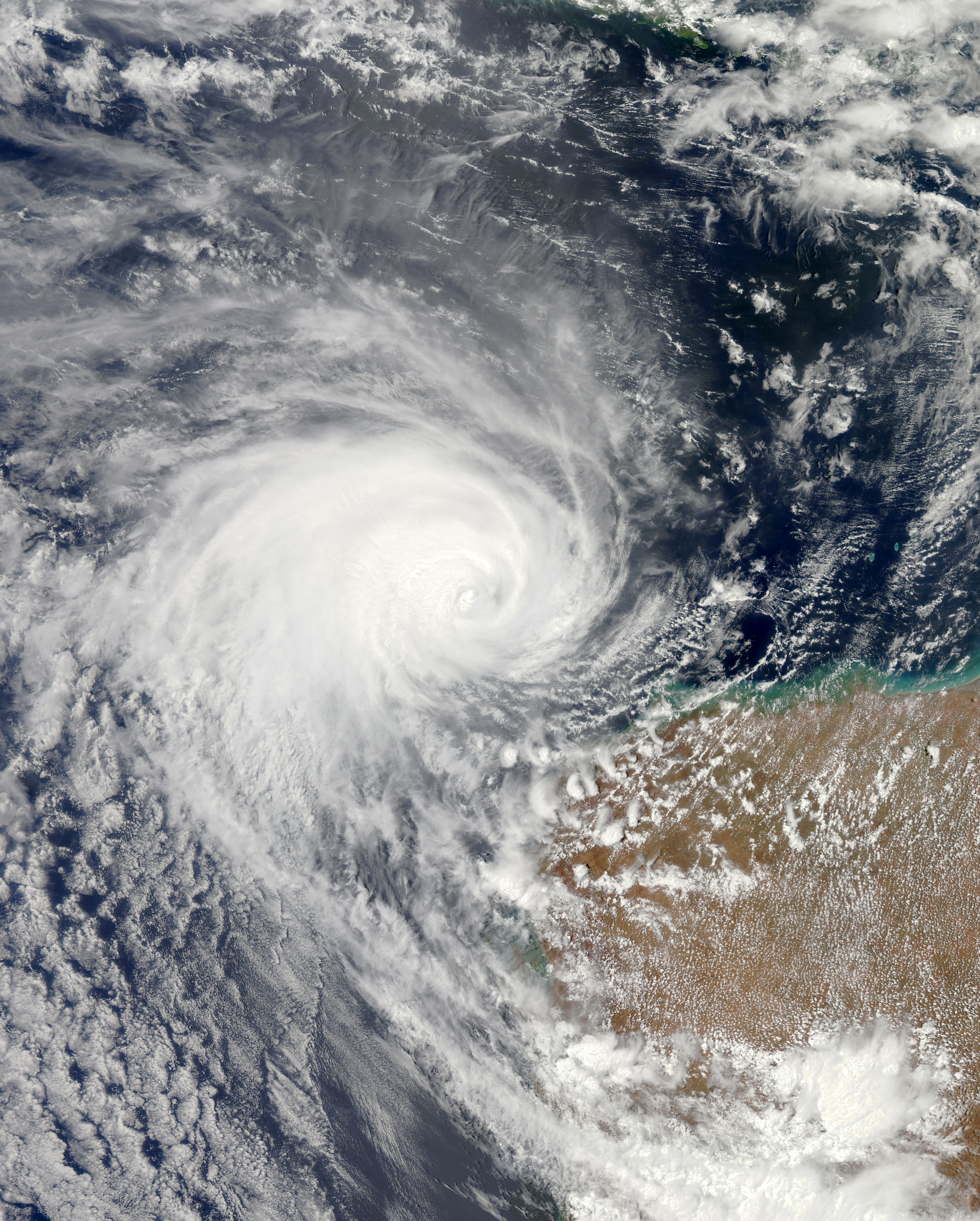
Narelle as a weakening tropical cyclone off the Western Australian coast on 12 January

After Narelle moved into TCWC Perth's area of responsibility on 9 January, a cyclone watch was issued for areas between Whim Creek and Coral Bay. A blue alert, the Department of Fire and Emergency Services (DFES) lowest level of readiness, was also issued for areas between Mardie and Whim Creek. The following day, the watch was upgraded to a cyclone warning for all areas and a new watch was issued to the west, encompassing areas as far as Cape Cuvier. The watch was further extended early on 11 January to include areas between Cape Cuvier and Carnarvon. As the storm continued on a more westward path than initially anticipated, the warning area was gradually decreased, with areas east of Roebourne receiving the all clear later on 11 January. The watch area, however, continued to expand and encompassed areas as far east as Denham. As the storm made its closet approach to Western Australia on 13 January, the watches and warnings area were gradually discontinued, with all advisories being discontinued that afternoon.

By 11 January, the Apache Corporation began evacuating all non-essential personnel from oil rigs in the path of the storm. The Rio Tinto Group shut down iron exports at its Dampier and Cape Lambert ports due to rough seas. Across the Pilbara region, the State Emergency Service advised residents to secure loose objects and ensure their emergency kits were stocked. Incident management teams were also established to help people in the wake of the storm. Additionally, urban search and rescue equipment was set up in Karratha. Horizon Power dispatched additional linemen to the most at-risk areas in Narelle's path to speed up power restoration in the wake of the storm. In Carnarvon, mango producers picked as much of their fruit as possible before the storm arrived to minimise losses.

Along the coast of Western Australia, between Onslow and Busselton, minor storm tides were reported, with a peak rise of 1.1 m (3.6 ft) in Onslow. This caused flooding in low-lying areas, though no damage was reported in relation to it. In North West Australia, especially around Exmouth, the storm brought gusty winds that downed a few trees and produced as much as 76 mm (3 in) of rain. Between 15 and 16 January, the remnants of the storm brought widespread moisture to southern areas of Western Australia, especially the wheatbelt region, leading to scattered showers and thunderstorms. A total of 39 mm (1.5 in) of rain fell in Ravensthorpe, with 22 mm (0.87 in) falling in a ten-minute span. A strong storm in Karlgarin produced winds up to 90 km/h (56 mph) that tore the roofs off eight buildings. Losses in the town exceeded A$70,000 (US$74,000). Winds in Lake Grace gusted up to 87 km/h (54 mph). According to Horizon Power, there was no loss of electricity across Western Australia. A potential tornado touched down near Capel, downing trees along a 400 m (1,300 ft) wide swath. In Perth, the storm brought unusually warm, moist air, keeping temperatures from dropping below 27.3 °C (81.1 °F), making it the warmest January night in 24 years.

=== Elsewhere ===
While still off the coast of Western Australia, moisture from Narelle brought scattered rains to South Australia. The heaviest totals were measured in Lameroo at 12.8 mm (0.50 in). In many areas, this ended a 28-day dry spell and brought relief amid a severe heat wave. Grape growers in Adelaide Hills also benefited from the rain and cooler temperatures. On 18 January, a French sailor had to abandon his yacht off the coast of Tasmania after its mast broke due to rough weather caused by the remnants of Narelle.

== See also ==
- Weather of 2013
- Tropical cyclones in 2013
- List of cyclones in Western Australia
