= Big John Dodo =

Indigenous Australian artist (c. 1910–2003)

- Born: John Dodo Nangkiriny c. 1910 near Bohemia Downs Station, Western Australia
- Died: 2003 (aged approx. 93); Broome, Western Australia
- Resting place: Bidyadanga, Western Australia
- Known for: Human head sculptures
- Style: Stone sculpture
- Movement: Indigenous Australian art

John Dodo Nangkiriny (c. 1910–2003), better known as Big John Dodo, was an Indigenous Australian cultural leader and artist. He was a leader of the Karajarri people of the Kimberley region of Western Australia. As an artist, he was known for his sandstone carvings of human heads.

== Biography ==
Dodo was born in about 1910 at Yilila, a locality near the Bohemia Downs Station, about 32 kilometres (20 mi) from Bidyadanga Community, Western Australia. He was known as a skilled stockman and worked on various cattle stations in the Kimberley. His work included "branding, fencing, maintaining water supplies and droving cattle to Meekatharra in a trip on horseback that could take 12 to 16 weeks". Dodo spent decades living at Anna Plains Station but he and his wife Rosie Munroe were evicted in the 1960s when Anna Plains was sold to new owners. They lived on another station for around 18 months before moving to the La Grange mission at Bidyadanga, where Dodo spent most of the rest of his life. He died in Broome in 2003 and was interred at Bidyadanga.

=== Cultural leadership ===
Dodo was an initiated member of the Karajarri people whose traditional lands lie around Lagrange Bay in the West Kimberley. However, he was initiated at Yawinya, located within Anna Plains Station on the traditional lands of the Nyangumarta. After settling at Bidyadanga, Dodo played a key role in maintaining a distinct cultural identity for the Karajarri following the state government's forcible resettlement of Mangarla and Nyigina people from the Great Sandy Desert at the La Grange mission. He was regarded as a pirrka (authority on tribal law).

In 1995, Dodo initiated a native title claim over the Karajarri's traditional lands, which was granted in 2002 in the name of "John Dudu Nangkiriny and Others on behalf of the Karajarri People". Federal Court judge Anthony North held evidentiary hearings at Bidyadanga, where Dodo – aged 90 – gave evidence of locations he had visited as a child with his parents and of the relationships between physical places and the Karajarri pukarrikarra (Dreaming).

== Artwork ==
Sandstone head by Dodo dating from 1974, held by Berndt Museum of Anthropology

According to Dodo, he produced his first head in about 1938 or 1939 when he was working at Anna Plains, carving a man's face out of mud with a pocket knife. His work attracted the attention of visiting anthropologist Helmut Petri. Dodo resumed his human head sculptures in the 1960s after settling at Bidyadanga, using mud and wood at first and later moving to limestone and sandstone. He was asked to carve a stone head of Jesus for the mission church. He used an image of the Shroud of Turin as a model, with the resulting sculpture used as an altarpiece.

Dodo's primary source of sandstone was Mount Phire (Karajarri: Payarr), a small hill located near Eighty Mile Beach around 96 kilometres (60 mi) south of Bidyadanga. The hill was surrounded by scattered pieces of stone, which according to Dodo's account of the Karajarri Dreaming were made when an ancestral family violated a taboo around consuming goanna eggs. The family then hid from the Rainbow Serpent on Mount Phire, which "attacked the mountain itself, biting off large chunks of rock".

=== Commercialisation ===
In the 1970s, Dodo's heads came to the attention of art dealer Mary Macha, who made regular collecting trips to the Kimberley and sold a number of heads from her gallery in Perth. His work later caught the interest of British businessman Lord McAlpine, a tourism promoter in Broome. McAlpine commissioned 100 heads from Dodo at AU$1,000 per head (equivalent to $5,000 in 2022). According to anthropologist John Stanton, this represented "an incredible amount of money in a period of high unemployment for Australia, and for remote Aboriginal people who were among the most impoverished in the country".

Dodo's work initiated what John Mateer has described as an "almost unknown minor art movement [...] now poorly known even among historians of Indigenous art". Other Karajarri people – including Ian Gilbert, Matthew Gilbert, Teddy Hunter and Darcey Hunter – were inspired by the lucrative nature of Dodo's work to produce human head sculptures of their own.

=== Reception and analysis ===
Dodo's works are held by the National Gallery of Australia (NGA) in Canberra, the Berndt Museum of Anthropology in Perth, and the Tandanya National Aboriginal Cultural Institute in Adelaide. His heads were initially exhibited with other Indigenous Australian art, but later included in general portraiture, including two exhibitions by the National Portrait Gallery in 1999 and 2003.

Two of Dodo's works featured in Tactility, a 2003 NGA exhibition curated by Brenda L. Croft, with the curator noting "affinities with the western tradition of the creation of busts as portraits which were popular in the late 19th and early 20th centuries". Art historian Darren Jorgensen has described Dodo's works as "largely anomalous and idiosyncratic" and placed them as a transitional form of Indigenous Australian art, "neither classical, emulating pre-colonial forms, nor contemporary, produced with entirely new materials such as paint and canvas".
