= Karajarri =

Indigenous Australian people

The Karajarri, also spelt Garadjara, are an Aboriginal Australian people of Western Australia. They live south-west of the Kimberleys in the northern Pilbara region, predominantly between the coastal area and the Great Sandy Desert. They now mostly reside at Bidyadanga, south of Broome. To their north live the Yawuru people, to the east the Mangala, to the northeast the Nyigina, and to their south the Nyangumarta. Further down the coast are the Kariera.

== Language ==
The first description of the grammar of their language, Garadjeri, was published by Gerhardt Laves in 1931. It belongs to the Marngu branch of the Pama-Nyungan language family. The native conceptualisation of its varieties recognises four dialect forms, the Najanaja (or Murrkut) dialect spoken by coastal Karajarri, Nangu spoken in the central hinterlands and Nawurtu further east inland. Garadjeri has had a notable influence on the Yawuru language, many of whose terms for ceremonies, and for naming the indigenous flora and fauna, have been borrowed from the Karajarri. As of 2004, less than 20 native speakers remain. Together with Nyangumarta, Karrajarri shows some features that are exceptional within the Kimberley Pama-Nyungan languages, in having bound pronominals affixed to inflecting verbs.

== Country ==
According to Norman Tindale, (Note: Tindale's estimates particularly for the peoples of the Western desert are not considered to be accurate. (Tonkinson 1989, p. 101)) Karajarri territory covers about 5,500 square miles (14,000 km^{2}). Running from Cape Villaret on the south of Roebuck Bay until a point 10 miles (16 km) north of Jawinja, at the intertribal corroboree gathering site known as Manari. Their inland extension reaches east as far as 70 miles (110 km). Notable Karajarri sites marking their boundaries are at Lendjarkading, Redjarth, Undurmadatj and Mount Phire (Paijara).

== Traditional social structure ==
The Karajarri are divided into two distinct groups, those who inhabit the coastal areas, called Naja (Nadja), and the inlanders dwelling on the eastern plains and bushlands, the Nawutu (Naudu). The social hierarchy is headed by ritual leaders (pirrka, literally 'roots of a tree'), male elders who organise ceremonial life, and who are also responsible for management of the country and the general affairs of tribal members. Members of a Karajarri group are classified in four ways, panaka, purrungu, parrjari and karimpa, a tribal taxonomy that is determined by alternate generation levels distinguished along moiety lines called inara. Thus one inara, represented by the barn swallow, is panaka-purrungu, being constituted by self, grandparents, sisters, brothers, cousins and grandchildren, together with marriageable partners and their siblings, the other, karimpa-parrjarri, is inclusive of one's mother, father, aunts, uncles, great-grandparents and grandchildren, and is emblemised in terms of the fork-tailed swift. Both the fork-tailed swift and barn swallow are viewed as heralds of rain.

Pukarri (dream) connote states of reality formed in the mythic Dreamtime when the landscape was created, and exercises a binding, inviolable force, the word being applied to institutional practices that are traced back to the primal order of things in a given tribal country. Marriage and kinship relationships are influenced by factors related to the implications that arise from their legends concerning the "living waters".

== Ecology ==
The area encompassed by Karajarri lands sits on the La Grange sub-basin, one of the richest groundwater areas in Western Australia, and a Pindan ecology, the pirra of the Karajarri inland, with stygofauna which has yet to be studied in any depth.

The Karajarri perceive their world (ngurrara 'one's own country') in terms of a mythology that weaves seamlessly together all the features of the landscape, the language and customs, a nexus which was then reflected in ritual practices. The language itself, as is generally the case among indigenous cultures of Australia, is thought of in terms of particular stretches of country, and each form was first spoken by the Dreamtime being who wandered the land, speaking each tongue depending on the tract of land where its speakers came to dwell.

In the Karajarri conception, one shared by many other nations in the region, such as the Nyigina, Yawuru, Nyangumarta and Mangala, the land is understood as coming from the "Dreaming", of which they are the custodians. Given the scarcity of fresh water, what they call "living water", the Karajarri secured their resources by a system of wells, soaks and springs throughout the wetlands. The management of the water is dictated by the need to respect and placate powerful serpentine beings in the waters. The concept may reflect, etymology suggests, a residue of the conception of a rainbow serpent, still attested in Arnhem Land lore. The word may be linked to the Arnhem land variant.)

There is a complex mythology concerning the living waters, focused on the spirits, pulany, dangerous or benign, that are thought to inhabit them, and are thought to be responsible for the seasonal replenishment of these water places. Special ceremonies are undertaken to ensure that the water beings make rain. Camping is avoided in such sites. The presence of such water snakes is often attested by panyjin reeds, the whiskers of the pulany, which can travel underground to emerge from tulkarru holes. There exists a Karajarri song to entice back into the waters the ancestral serpent if a spring dries up, in order to refresh the aquifer. It is transmitted for such an emergency, though circumstances have never changed to require its recitation.

The first white man's survey of the area, conducted by a party led by Frederick Kennedy Panter, commander of the schooner New Perseverance. After striking inland for 50 miles, Panter returned to report that the land was furnished with numerous native wells, thickly wooded and endowed with groves of cajeput eucalypts suitable for construction. Overall, Panter concluded the Karajarri lands offered "40,000 acres of splendidly grassed land", while the natives were "quiet" and "friendly". The area was one the Karajarri call pajalpi or "spring country" given the richness of its spring waters and the lush growth of local plants there.

== History of contact ==
The Karajarri developed a ceremonial rite to govern the introduction of strangers into their midst, and to pacify the potential for danger in these encounters. They call non-indigenous people walanyu (strangers from beyond), a concept that also embraces hostile spirits and other inland Aboriginal people. It is thought that East Asian maritime sailors visited their region before the era of white exploration. Generally they would trade and barter with the Asian hired hands working the British pearling luggers, such as the Timorese, Chinese, Malays, Javanese and Japanese. In Karajarri practice, walanyu could drop their outsider status once if the recognized the pirrka, were properly introduced, and had exchanged gifts.

After Panter's report was circulated, the Roebuck Bay Pastoral Company was formed and a ship, Nile, was commissioned in Freemantle to establish a presence in Karakarri territory, with company representatives and a contingent of police troopers. They set up a camp near Cape Vilaret and appropriated a local well, one of the few on the coast with fresh water. Hostilities broke out, as sorties to take over wells or cut timber were resisted. Attempts to drive them off were repelled for some months, causing the loss of life among some locals.

An expedition led by James Richard Harding (1838–1864), comprising Panter, William Henry Goldwyer (1829–1864) and three police troopers, set out to explore the pajalpi lands suitable for pastoral development south around La Grange Bay. Martin had reported a regular system of wells 3–4 m deep, at intervals of a mile, stretching inland from Roebuck and La Grange. The three intruders encountered native resistance and, in a day, in two incidents shot three Indigenous people then a further 15, as they defended their campsite at a small lake called Boolla Boolla, otherwise known to the Karajarri as Injitana, a Karajarri sacred ceremonial site. According to their traditional account, the expedition had desecrated a sacred site, a rainmaking permanent water place. The white men in turn were overrun and killed. Nile left the area in January 1865 with the men still missing.

Stock routes in the 1880s such as those opened up by Nat Buchanan, who developed the de Grey-Kimberley stockroute, often followed Aboriginal Dreamtime contours and their sacred watering sites, and, as government inspectors noted, those who took up pastoral leases often then denied native peoples access to the wells on their stations. Eventually the Karajarri and other regional tribes, especially after the Aborigines Act (1905), were taken on as indentured labour, their local knowledge of the waterways and lay of the land being of great use to the pastoralists.

In the 1930s the anthropologists Ralph Piddington and A. P. Elkin surveyed the water soaks and wells, and their function within Karajarri thought and life.

== Native title and development ==
Following the landmark High Court Mabo ruling handed down in 1992, which repudiated the prevailing doctrine that Australia had been a terra nullius, and recognised the common law validity of the concept of native title, the Karajarri – with elder John Dodo Nangkiriny as lead plaintiff – moved to gather evidence for an application to secure legal acknowledgement and endorsement of their claim to the traditional Karajarri lands. At the same time Western Agricultural Industries, a private development company, was eyeing the Karajarri lands for the potential their abundant waters offered for establishing a vast irrigation scheme for cotton production, though subsidiary cultivations of sugar cane, leucaena, exotic hardwoods, hemp, viticulture and freshwater aquafarming were also envisaged. The earlier Camballin Irrigation Scheme, implementing similar aims, turned the region immediately to the north of the Karajarri lands into a dustbowl, the toxic washout of chemical fertilisers leading to drastic losses of local fish-eating species like pelicans and ibis, and the disappearance of kangaroos. The principle of earlier law remains in place: the waters themselves are commonwealth property, and the Indigenous peoples have only the right of usufruct.

The Karajarri Indigenous Protected Area was established in 2014, with the Karajarri rangers practising fire-stick farming to encourage biodiversity in the area.

== Alternative names ==
- Garadjara
- Garadjari, Karadjeri, Garadjeri
- Karadhari, Garad'are
- Kularupulu (generic Nyangumarta exonym for their coastal branch and the coastal Karajarri)
- Laradjeri (misprint)
- Minala (minal means 'east', used of inland Karajarri social bands)
- Nadja (coastal Karajarri)
- Nadjanadja
- Naudu (inlander Karajarri)
- Nawudu (Yawuru and Nyigina exonym)
- Nawurungainj (Nyangumarta and Mangala term)

Source: Tindale 1974, p. 244

== Books about Karajarri life and lore ==
- Liz Thompson, The Danger Seed: Lirrinngkirn Dreaming a Story from Karajarri Country, Pearson Education Australia, 2011

== Contemporary Karajarri music ==
- Family Shoveller Band, Muntarurru (Black Wasp), Wyirrt Wyirrt (Food of the Country), Wanamulnynong

== Sources ==
- "AIATSIS map of Indigenous Australia". AIATSIS. 14 May 2024.
- Bagshaw, Geoffrey (2003). The Karajarri claim: a case-study in native title anthropology. University of Sydney. ISBN 978-1-864-87592-8.
- Bowern, Claire (2006). "Another Look at Australia as a Linguistic Area". In Matras, Yaron; McMahon, April; Vincent, Nigel (eds.). Linguistic Areas: Convergence in Historical and Typological Perspective. Macmillan. pp. 244–264. ISBN 978-0-230-28761-7.
- Gerritsen, Rupert (2008). Australia and the Origins of Agriculture. Archaeopress. ISBN 978-1-407-30354-3.
- Ghassemi, Fereidoun; White, Ian (2007). Inter-Basin Water Transfer: Case Studies from Australia, United States, Canada, China and India. Cambridge University Press. ISBN 978-1-139-46304-1.
- Gover, Kirsty (2010). Tribal Constitutionalism: States, Tribes, and the Governance of Membership. Oxford University Press. ISBN 978-0-199-58709-4.
- Jickling, Bob (2006). Environmental Education, Ethics & Action: A Workbook to Get Started. United Nations Environment Programme. ISBN 978-9-280-72656-5.
- "Karajarri Overview". Wangka Maya Pilbara Aboriginal Language Centre. 2016. Archived from the original on 9 October 2016.
- Kerwin, Dale (2010). Aboriginal Dreaming Paths and Trading Routes: The Colonisation of the Australian Economic Landscape. Sussex Academic Press. ISBN 978-1-845-19338-6.
- Lowe, Pat (2005). "You call its desert..we used to live there". In Rose, Deborah Bird; Davis, Richard (eds.). Dislocating the Frontier: Essaying the Mystique of the Outback. Australian National University Press. pp. 91–96. ISBN 978-1-920-94237-3.
- Martin, James; Panter, Frederick K. (1864). Journals and reports of two voyages to the Glenelg River and the North West Coast of Australia 1863-4. A. Shenton. pp. 44–47.
- McGregor, William B. (2013). The Languages of the Kimberley, Western Australia. Routledge. ISBN 978-0-465-01997-7.
- Nekes, Hermann; Worms, Ernest Ailred; McGregor, William (2006). Australian Languages. Mouton de Gruyter. ISBN 978-3-110-17597-4.
- Piddington, Ralph (1930). "The Water-Serpent in Karadjeri Mythology". Oceania. 1 (3): 352–354. doi:10.1002/j.1834-4461.1930.tb01656.x. JSTOR 40327334.
- Prober, Suzanne M.; O'Connor, Michael H.; Walsh, Fiona J. (2011). "Australian Aboriginal Peoples' Seasonal Knowledge: a Potential Basis for Shared Understanding in Environmental Management". Ecology and Society. 16 (2). doi:10.5751/ES-04023-160212. hdl:10535/7588.
- Skyring, Fiona; Yu, Sarah (2008). "'Strange strangers': First contact between Europeans and Karajarri people on the Kimberley coast of West Australia". In Neale, Margo; Veth, Peter; Sutton, Peter (eds.). Strangers on the Shore. National Museum of Australia Press. pp. 60–75. ISBN 978-1-876-94488-9.
- Terry, Michael (1931). Hidden Wealth and Hiding People. G. P. Putnam's Sons.
- "Tindale Tribal Boundaries" (PDF). Department of Aboriginal Affairs, Western Australia. September 2016. Archived from the original (PDF) on 8 March 2016.
- Tindale, Norman Barnett (1974). "Karadjari (WA)". Aboriginal Tribes of Australia: Their Terrain, Environmental Controls, Distribution, Limits, and Proper Names. Australian National University. ISBN 978-0-708-10741-6. Archived from the original on 20 March 2020.
- Tonkinson, Robert (1989). "Local Organisation and Land Tenure in the Karlamilyi (Rudall River) Region" (PDF). In Western Desert Working Group (ed.). The significance of the Karlamilyi Region to the Martujarra people of the Western Desert. Perth: Department of Conservation and Land Management. pp. 99–259.
- Tran, Tran (2016). "The (non-Legal) Guide to Meaningful Recognition". In Sillitoe Palutikof, Paul (ed.). Indigenous Studies and Engaged Anthropology: The Collaborative Moment. Routledge. pp. 163–179. ISBN 978-1-317-11722-3.
- Tran, Tran; Weir, Jessica K.; Strelein, Lisa M.; Stacey, Clalre (2014). "Indigenous governance and climate change adaptation: two native title case studies from Australia". In Palutikof, Jean P.; Boulter, Sarah L.; Barnett, Jon; Rissik i, David (eds.). Applied Studies in Climate Adaptation. John Wiley & Sons. pp. 307–315. ISBN 978-1-118-84503-5.
- Watson, Irene (2014). Aboriginal Peoples, Colonialism and International Law: Raw Law. Routledge. ISBN 978-1-317-93836-1.
- Weir, Jessica K. (2012). Country, Native Title and Ecology. Australian National University Press. ISBN 978-1-921-86256-4.
- Weir, Jessica K.; Stone, Roy; Mulardy, Mervyn (2012). "Water Planning and Native Title: A Karajarri and Government Engagement in the West Kimberley" (PDF). Country, native title and ecology. Australian National University Press. pp. 81–103. ISBN 978-1-921-86256-4.
- Yu, Sarah (1999). Ngapa Kunangkul: Living Water. University of Western Australia.
