= Nyangumarta =

Nyangumarta may refer to:

- Nyangumarta people of Western Australia
- Nyangumarta language, their language
