= Mangarla =

Indigenous people of Western Australia

The Mangarla, or Mangala, are an Aboriginal Australian people of Western Australia. The Mangarla people traditionally lived in the north-western area of the Great Sandy Desert, west of the Karajarri people, east of the Walmajarri, with the Juwaliny and Yulparija to the south. Many Mangarla people now live in Jarlmadangah and Bidyadanga.

== Mangarla language ==
The Mangarla language is one of the Marrngu languages of the Pama–Nyungan family. Two dialect varieties of their tongue are attested, Kakutu/Kakurtu and Ngulatu/Ngulartu. Mangarla is an endangered language, with less than 20 native speakers according to a 2002 census. The Pallottine Catholic priest Father Kevin McKelson (1926–2011), known to the 5 tribes whose languages he mastered as Japulu (father) compiled the first dictionary of the language in 1998, a work which formed the basis for a dictionary co-authored with Albert Burgman in 2005.

== Country ==
Traditional Mandala territory covered approximately 15,600 square miles (40,000 km^{2}) on the desert plateau about the McLarty Hills, north to Geegully Creek, and the headwaters of Edgar Range; northwest to the plateau above Dampier Downs, extending to the coast.

== History of contact ==
The Mangarla, like the Walmajarri, Wangkatjungka and Nyigina. were bundled together by the early white colonizers as a "desert mob" because of the arid territory they lived in. Starting from around 1885, when pastoralists began to use their territory for grazing stock, many men from the Mangarla tribe were rounded up to work as jackaroos, in exchange for an annual pay of a pair of boots, a shirt and trousers.,Some were offered money that was kept for 'safe keeping' by their 'employers' a situation that descendants say persisted until the 1967 referendum and constitutional amendment by the Holt Government established the principle of equal pay, after which many lost their jobs.

== Native title ==
In 2014, in a decision handed down by Justice John Gilmour of the Federal Court of Australia, the Nyikina-Mangarla people were granted native title to 26,000 square kilometres (10,000 sq mi) of territory extending from the King Sound through the Fitzoy Valley to the Great Sandy Desert.

== See also ==
- Ngurrara, a grouping of peoples of language groups including Mangarla

== Notes and references ==
=== References ===
- "AIATSIS map of Indigenous Australia". AIATSIS. 14 May 2024.
- "Tindale Tribal Boundaries" (PDF). Department of Aboriginal Affairs, Western Australia. September 2016. Archived from the original (PDF) on 8 March 2016.
- Burgman, Albert; McKelson, Kevin (2005). Mangala Dictionary and Topical Finderlist. Wangka Maya Pilbara Aboriginal Language Centre. ISBN 978-1-875-94621-1.
- "A Brief History". Kimberley Dreamtime Adventure Tours. 2016.
- "After 18 years, Traditional Owners of the Fitzroy River get native title". Kimberley Land Council. 29 May 2014.
- McGregor, William (2001). "The verb HAVE in Nyulnyulan languages". In Baron, Irène; Herslund, Michael; Sørensen, Finn (eds.). Dimensions of Possession. John Benjamins Publishing. pp. 67–84. ISBN 978-9-027-29801-0.
- McGregor, William B. (2013). The Languages of the Kimberley, Western Australia. Routledge. ISBN 978-0-465-01997-7.
- Mills, Vanessa (29 November 2011). "The loss of Father Kevin McKelson keenly felt in Kimberley communities". ABC News.
- Toussaint, Sandy (1999). "Kimberley Peoples of Fitzroy Valley, Western Australia". In Lee, Richard B.; Daly, Richard Heywood (eds.). The Cambridge Encyclopedia of Hunters and Gatherers. Cambridge University Press. pp. 339–342. ISBN 978-0-521-57109-8.
- "Mangala". Wangka Maya Pilbara Aboriginal Language Centre. 2016.
- Tindale, Norman Barnett (1974). Aboriginal Tribes of Australia: Their Terrain, Environmental Controls, Distribution, Limits, and Proper Names. Australian National University. ISBN 978-0-708-10741-6.
