= Mandora Marsh =

Wetland system in Western Australia

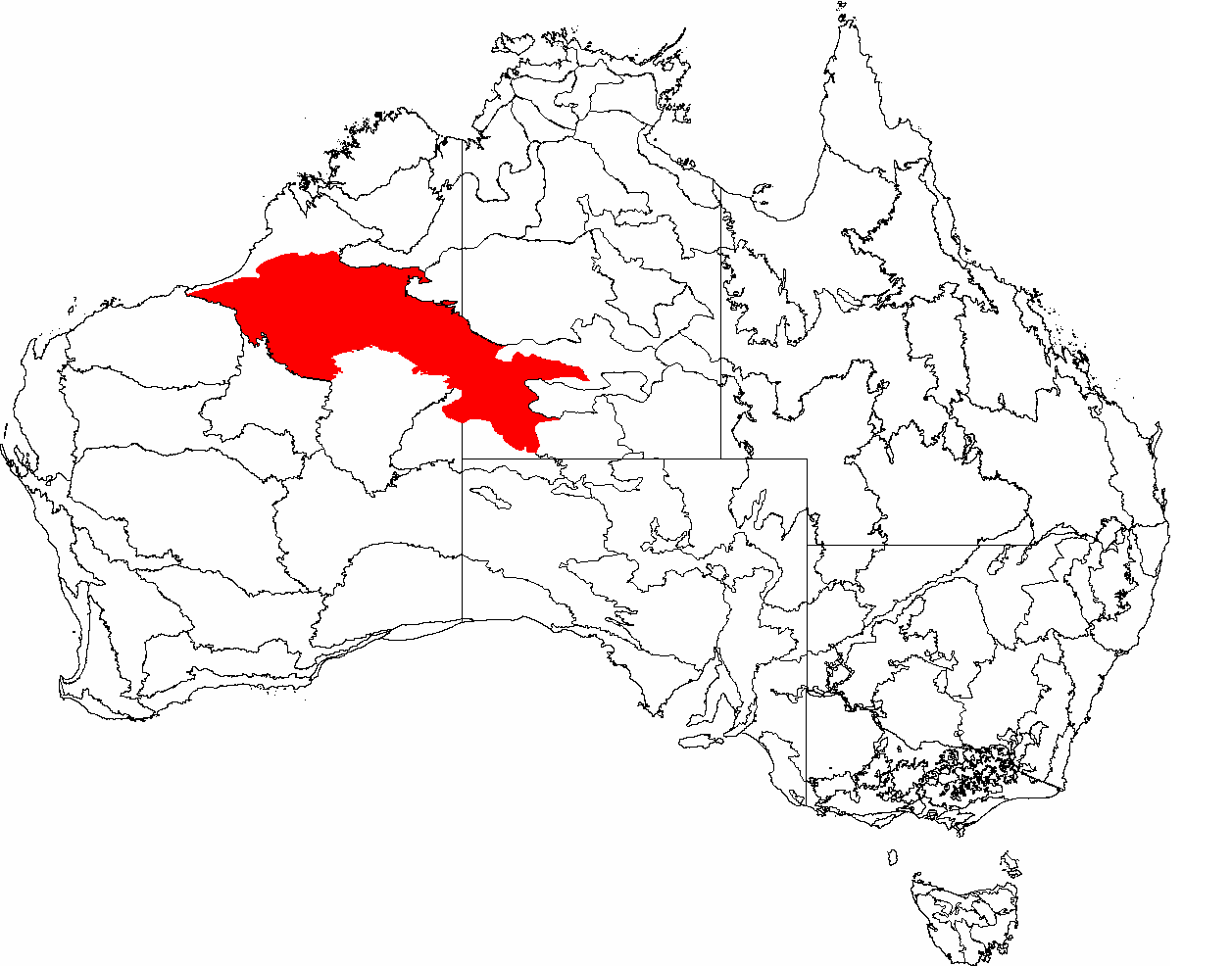
Great Sandy Desert IBRA bioregion in red

Mandora Marsh, also known as Mandora Salt Marsh, is a complex and diverse wetland system in Western Australia close to Eighty Mile Beach, and included in the Eighty Mile Beach Ramsar Site. It lies at the western edge of the Great Sandy Desert bioregion and within the Mandora Station pastoral lease. The marsh is part of the 3337 km^{2} Mandora Marsh and Anna Plains Important Bird Area, identified as such by BirdLife International because of its importance for supporting large numbers of waders and waterbirds.

== Description ==
Mandora Marsh has formed over thousands of years on what used to be the lower reaches and estuary of an ancient river. The main features are two large lakes which are flooded after heavy cyclonic rainfall. The westernmost Lake Walyarta 19°46′S 121°17′E is a claypan that extends eastwards about 30 km from the inland side of the Great Northern Highway. Although its width may reach 5 km, the depth of water never exceeds 2 m. The eastern lake 19°47′S 121°35′E is separated from Walyarta by a calcrete ridge. It is a broad and braided drainage line containing islands of vegetation that floods extensively but soon dries out to a series of isolated salt and claypans. Connecting the lakes is Salt Creek, a mangrove-lined watercourse about 5 km long and 20 m wide. It holds permanent water and appears to be fed by a series of soaks.

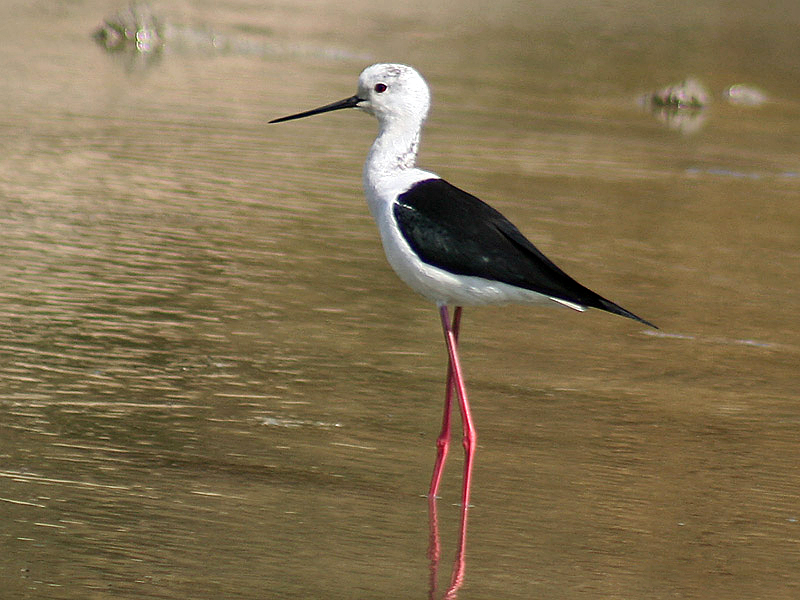
Black-winged stilt

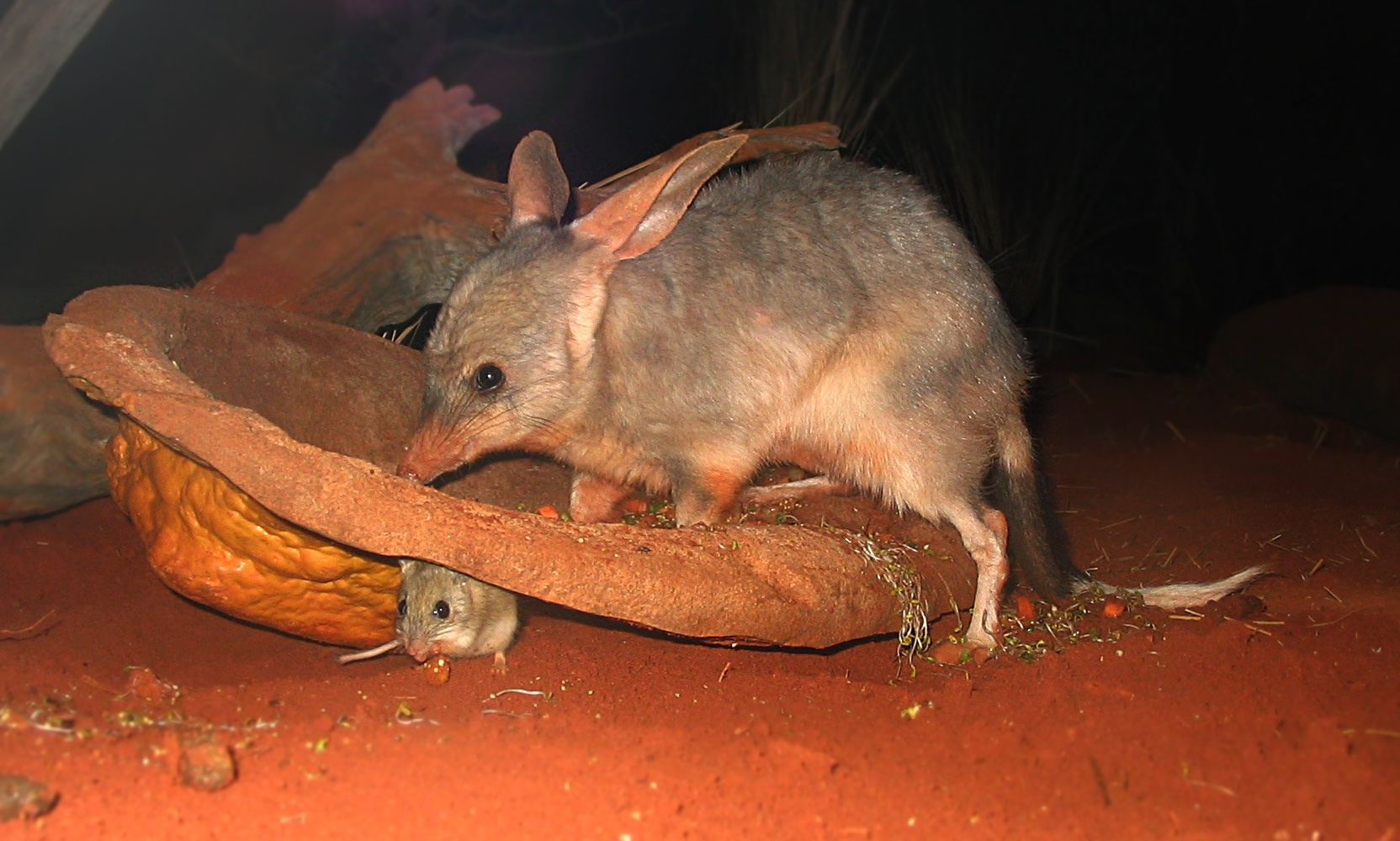
Bilby

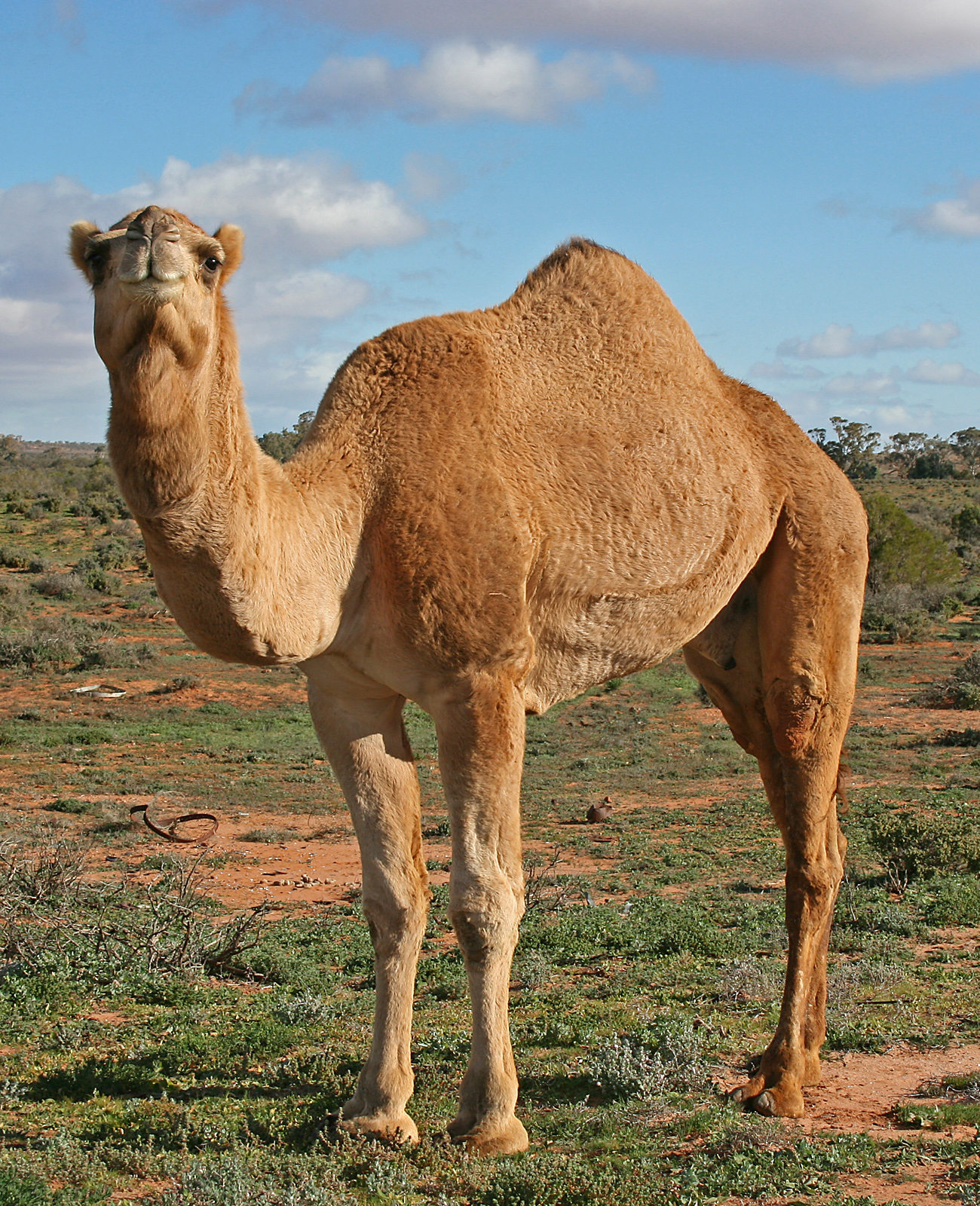
Australian feral camel

Despite its alternative name, as well as its saline wetlands Mandora Marsh includes a number of permanent or almost permanent freshwater swamps supplied by springs along the southern side of the two main lakes. The springs are usually formed of a central, raised mound, 2–3 m high, of saturated peat, supporting a mixture of Melaleuca and Sesbania trees, with mangroves appearing at the saline and brackish springs. The springs vary in size from 0.1 to several hectares; each spring's mound is generally surrounded by a moat, varying from a maximum depth of 50 cm to isolated shallow pools or just wet soil. Many springs also support small stands of cumbungi with the understories of some dominated by the fern Achrostichum speciosum. Thickets of saltwater paperbark are found where flood waters remain longest; stock watering bores have been established in these thickets, and the watering troughs are used by waterbirds throughout the year. The most spectacular of the springs is Mandora Soak, a raised peat bog estimated to be 7000 years old.

== Flora and fauna ==
Some 269 species of vascular plants, from 55 families, have been collected from Mandora Salt Marsh. This includes 37 species from the Poaceae, or true grass family, and nine introduced weeds. The most inland occurrence of mangroves in Australia is an isolated stand of grey mangroves in the eastern lake of the marsh, 60 km inland from Eighty-mile Beach. A new species of bush tomato, Solanum oligandrum, known only from the Mandora Marsh area, was first described in 2001.

A total of 55 species of waterbirds have been seen at the marsh, of which at least 13 species have been recorded breeding there. Particularly common ones include black-winged stilt, whiskered tern, grey teal, white-necked heron, and great egret. Australian pelicans and black swans breed there in large numbers when floods make conditions suitable.

The threatened bilby, which is specially protected by the Commonwealth Environment Protection and Biodiversity Conservation Act 1999, has been recorded in sandy sites within the marsh. Altogether, 22 species of mammal, 49 reptiles and six frogs have been recorded there, while a new goby species has been discovered in Salt Creek.

== Traditional ownership ==
The Mandora Marsh is of high cultural significance to the Nyangumarta people, who hold native title over the area.

== Conservation ==
Cattle grazing has caused substantial deterioration in the vegetation and physical environment of the springs and Salt Creek; Saunders Spring in 1997, and Grants Spring in 2001, were fenced to limit further damage. High numbers of feral camels and cats are present in the marsh.
