= Eighty Mile Beach =

Beach in Western Australia

Designations

Ramsar Wetland
- Official name: Eighty-mile Beach
- Designated: 7 June 1990
- Reference no.: 480

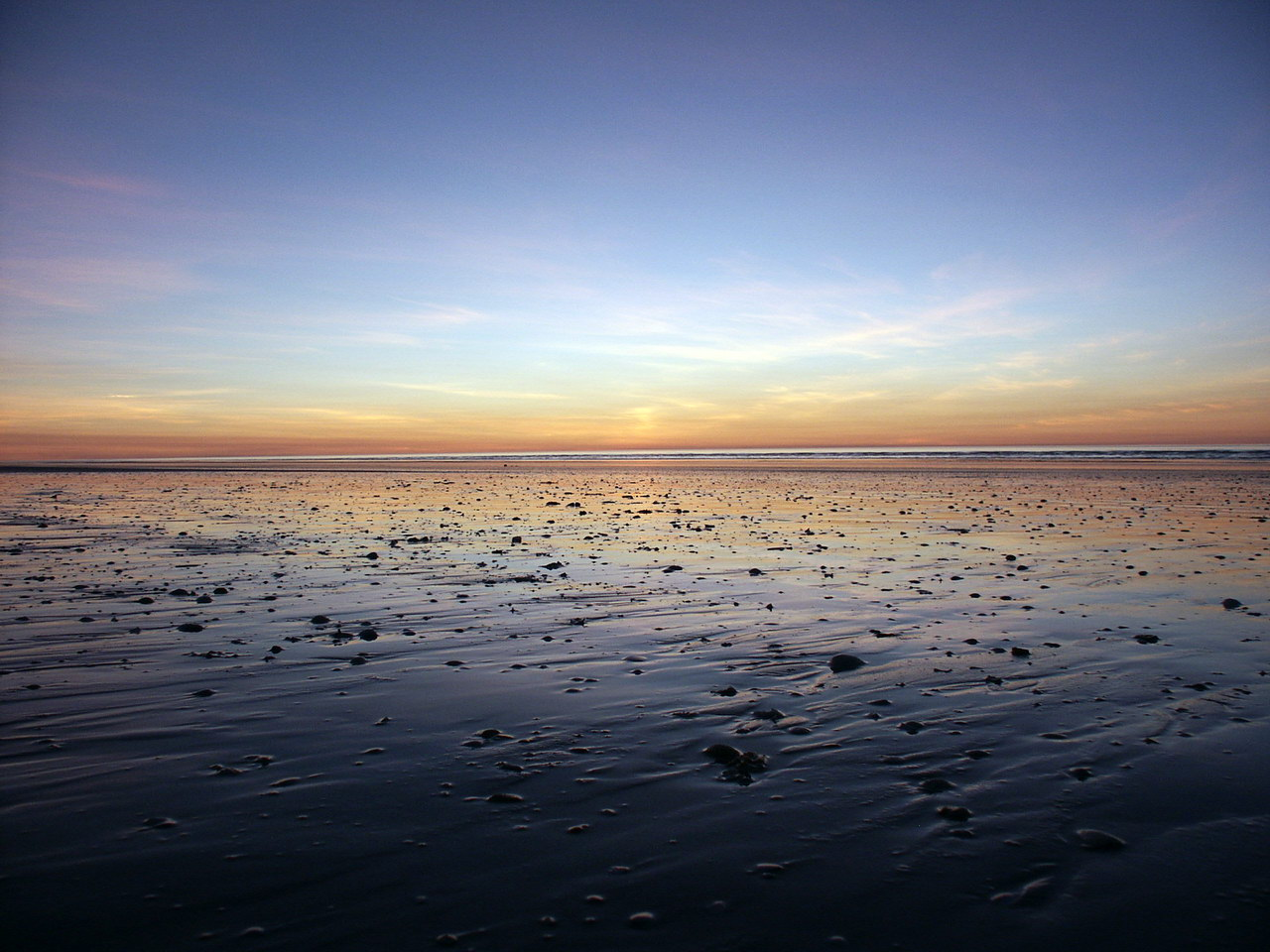
Eighty Mile Beach at sunset

Eighty Mile Beach also spelled Eighty-mile Beach or 80-mile Beach, and formerly called 90-mile Beach, lies along the north-west coast of Western Australia about half-way between the towns of Broome and Port Hedland. Despite its name, it is some 220 kilometres (140 miles) in length, forming the coastline where the Great Sandy Desert approaches the Indian Ocean; this makes it arguably the longest beach in the world, although the coastline paradox makes this practically impossible to determine for sure, with Praia do Cassino in Brazil possibly being longer. It is one of the most important sites for migratory shorebirds, or waders, in Australia, and is recognised as a wetland of international importance under the Ramsar Convention on Wetlands.

== History ==
=== Traditional ownership and usage ===
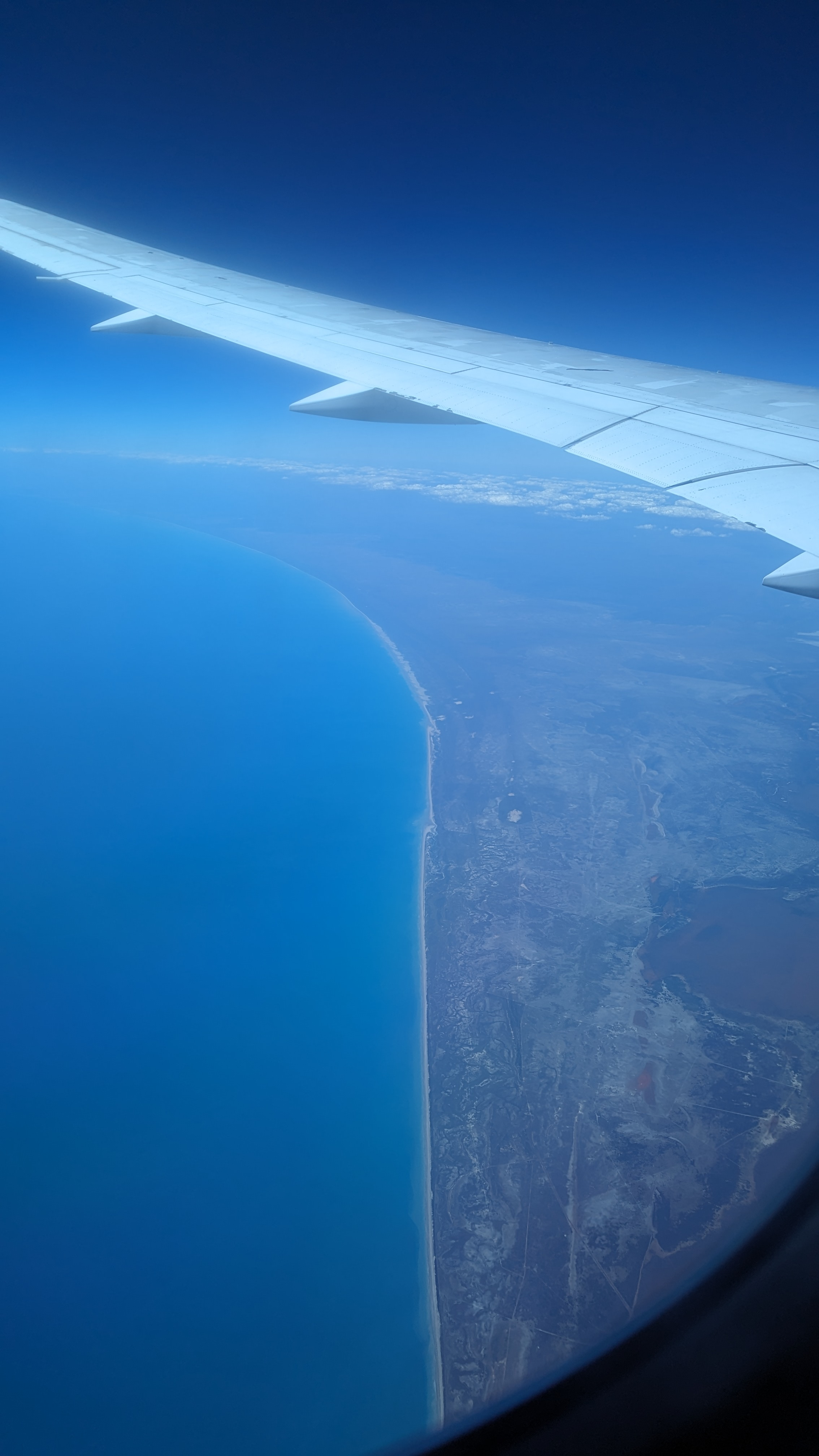
80-mile beach as viewed from a Scoot Airways flight from Singapore to Melbourne, looking north east

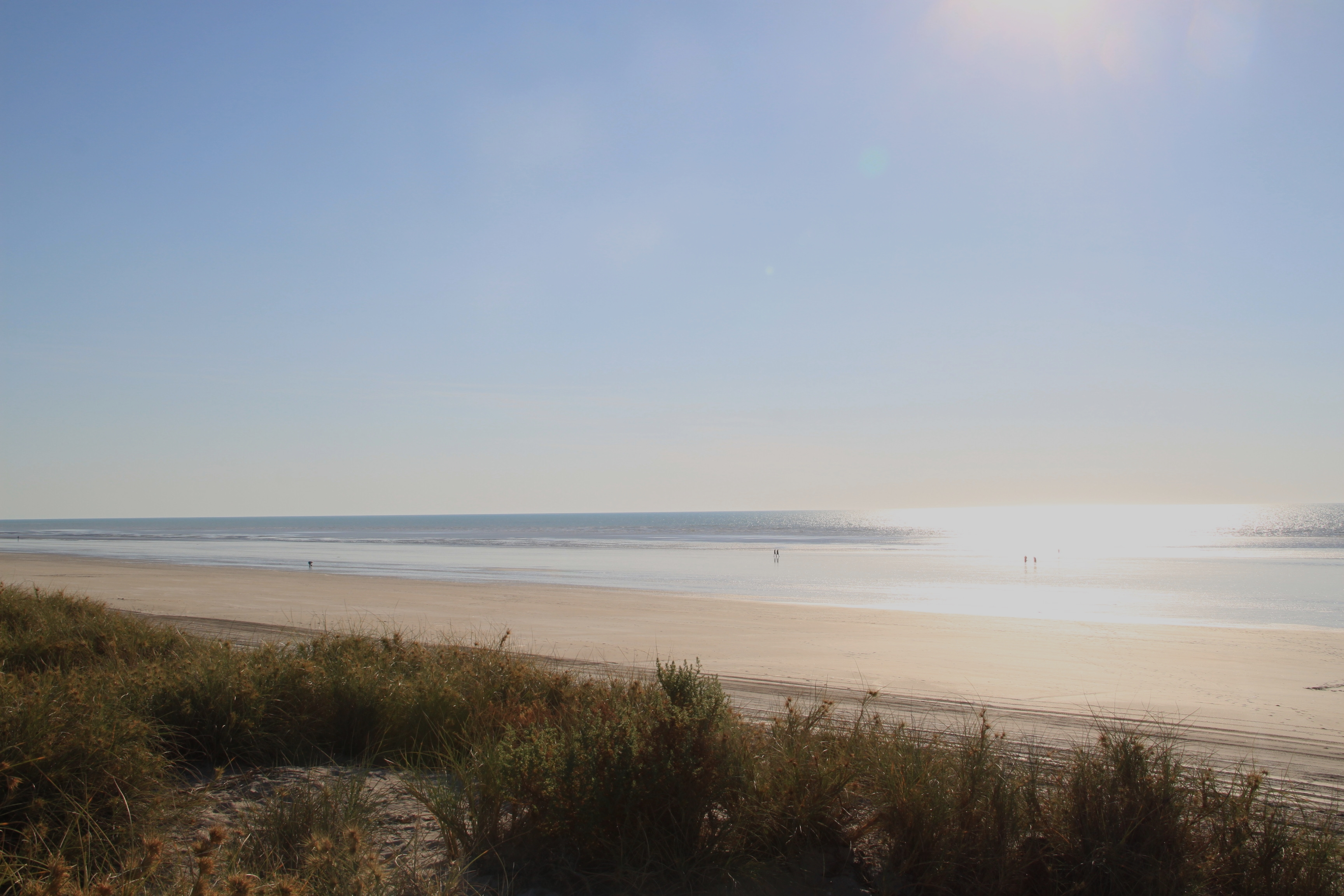
Eighty Mile Beach 2011

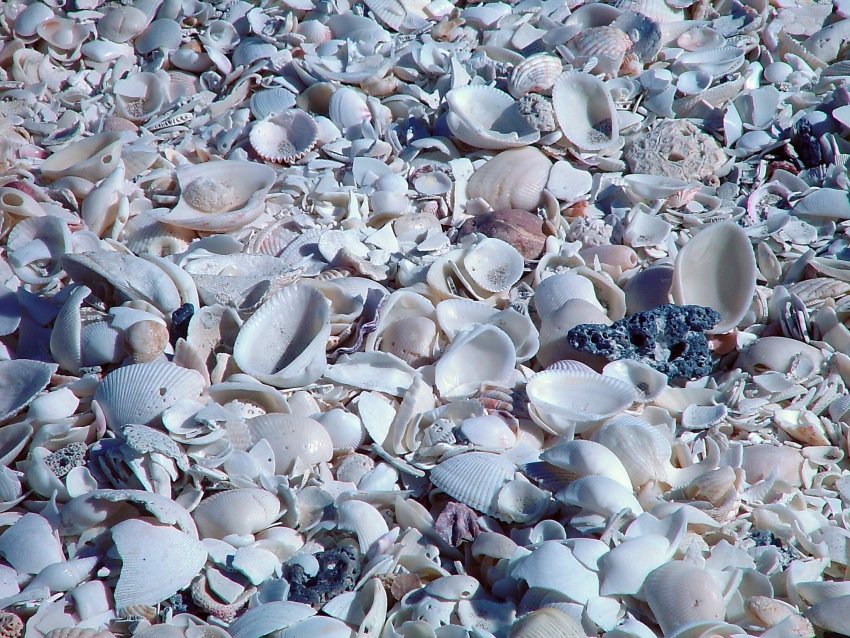
Eighty Mile Beach shells

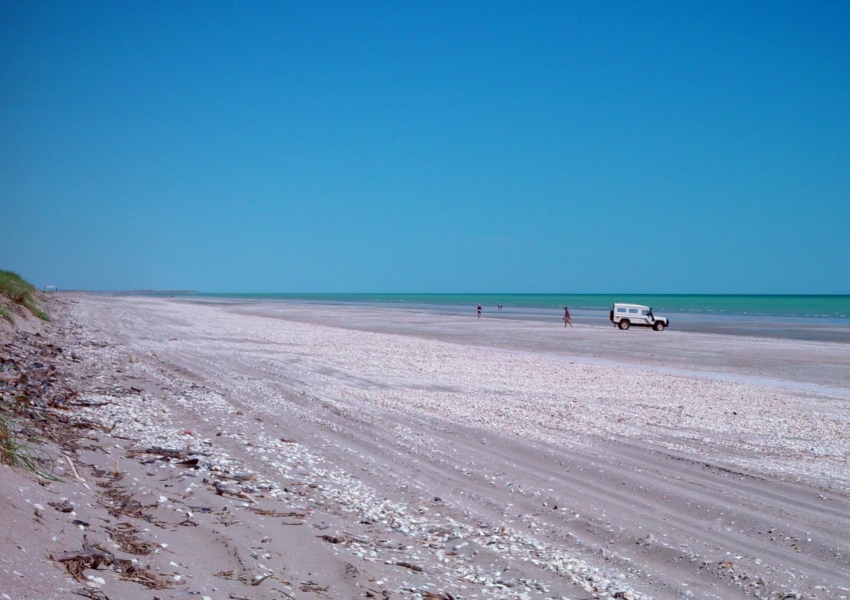
Eighty Mile Beach 2004

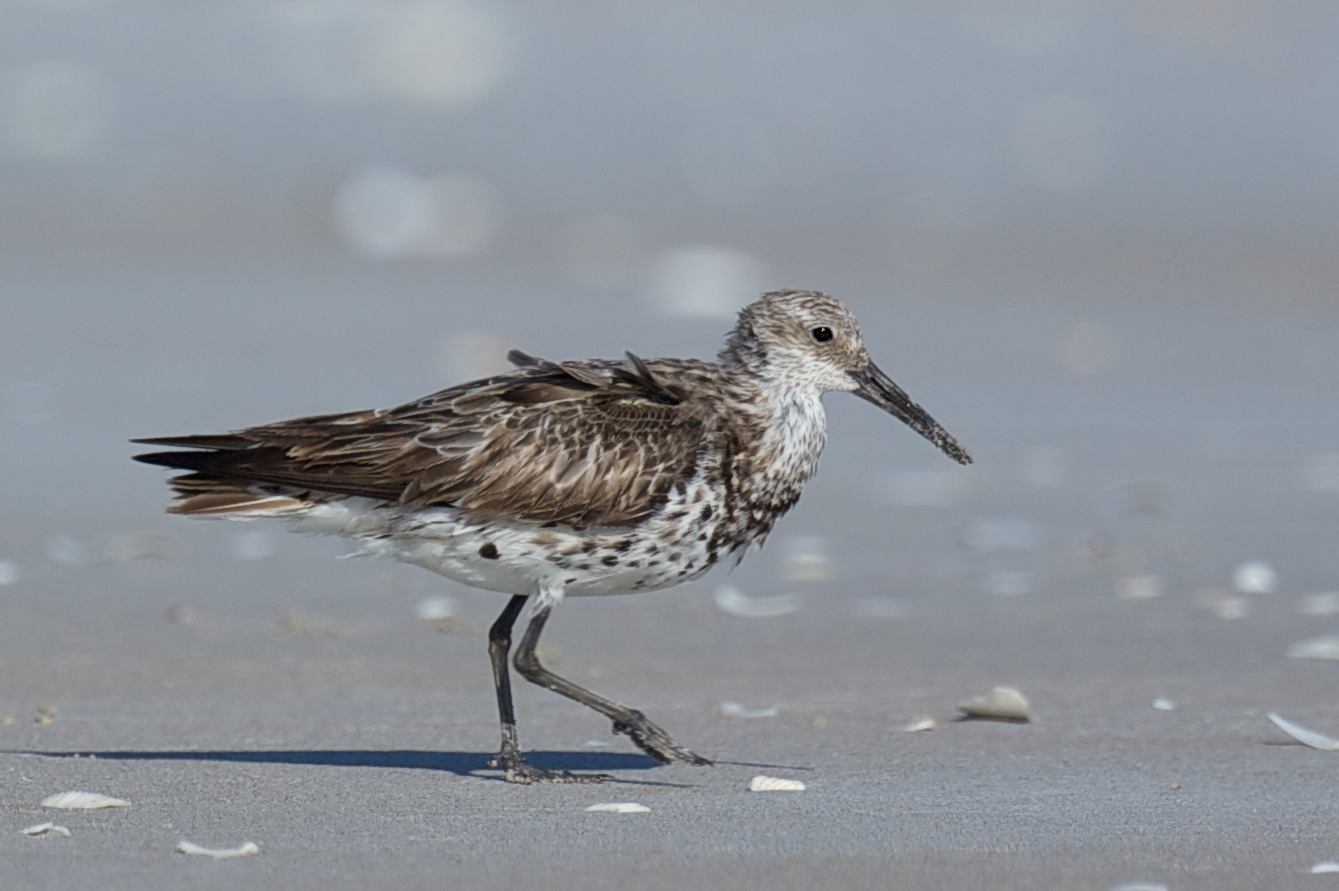
Great knot on Eighty Mile Beach

The southern section of Eighty Mile Beach is part of the traditional territory of the Nyangumarta people, who maintain a strong connection to the area with many songs, stories and ceremonies associated with sites along and in the vicinity of the beach. In June 2009 the Federal Court of Australia determined that the Nyangumarta People were the valid native title holders of that section of the beach. The judgement of the Court was delivered on country at Nyiyamarri Pukurl, a site adjacent to the Eighty Mile Beach Caravan Park.

Traditional ownership of the northern part of Eighty Mile Beach, within the vicinity of the Anna Plains pastoral lease, is shared between the Nyangumarta People and the Karajarri (or Garadjari) People. The two groups filed overlapping native title determination applications over the area, which were determined together on 25 May 2012. The judgement of the Court was delivered on country at Talgarno, a former military site within the Anna Plains pastoral lease.

In the Karajarri language, Eighty Mile Beach is called Wender, meaning "a creaking noise", with reference to the sound of walking through dry sand. Many Aboriginal people with connections to the area now live at the Bidyadanga Community (formerly the La Grange Mission) and nearby at Frazier Downs. Several soaks, known as lirri, lie behind the beach and were traditionally important as sources of fresh water. Many of the soaks became Water Reserves on the Kimberley-De Grey Stock Route, which was used until the 1960s for long distance cattle-droving.

=== Name ===
The beach was known as 90-mile beach until 1946 when the name was changed to avoid confusion with Ninety Mile Beach, Victoria.

=== Military use ===
The Talgarno military base, east of Anna Plains homestead, was important in the post-Second World War period for the monitoring and recovery of British Blue Streak rockets, test-fired from Woomera, South Australia. A gravel airstrip, artesian bores and concrete blockhouses remain. In 1999 the Department of Defence test-fired a missile from a site on Anna Plains, in connection with the development of the Jindalee over-the-horizon radar project.

=== Shorebird research ===
Because of its importance for shorebirds, Eighty Mile Beach is classified as an Important Bird Area (IBA) and is one of the principal shorebird study sites in north-western Australia. It regularly supports over 400,000 shorebirds, including over 1% of the global populations of bar-tailed godwits, eastern curlews, great knots, red knots, red-necked stints, grey-tailed tattlers, Terek sandpipers, pied oystercatchers, greater sand plovers, Oriental plovers, red-capped plovers and Oriental pratincoles, with irregular high counts of other species. Since 1981 almost yearly expeditions by the Australasian Wader Studies Group have been banding and counting shorebirds there as part of a long-term program of monitoring the populations using the East Asian – Australasian Flyway. Since 1992 most birds caught have also been leg-flagged to discover their precise migration routes and staging sites.

== Description ==
=== Geography ===
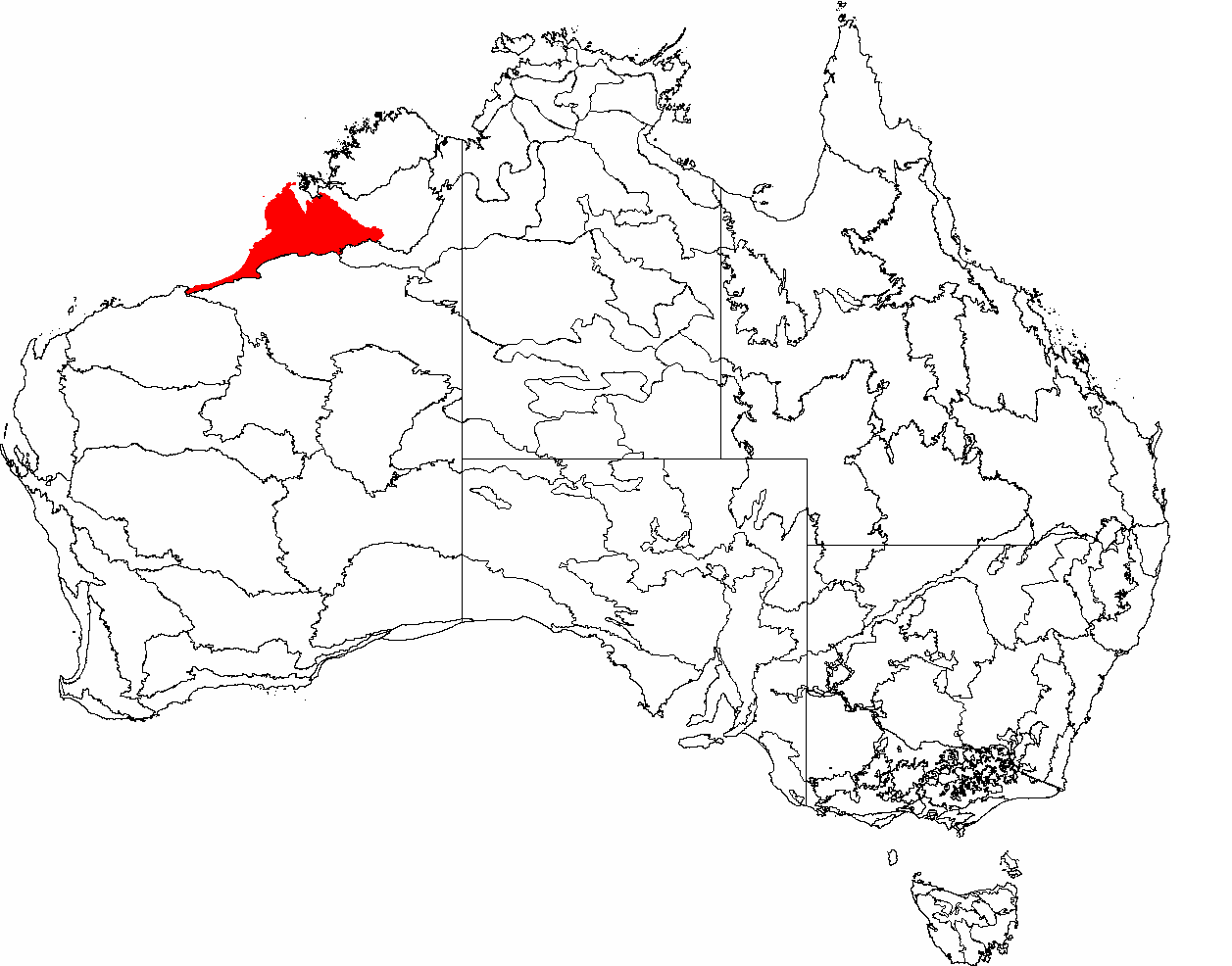
Eighty Mile Beach lies along the thin south-western extension of the Dampierland bioregion (shown in red)

Eighty Mile Beach lies in the Shire of Broome in the Kimberley region of Western Australia, in the Dampierland bioregion. It extends south-west from Cape Missiessy 19°03′S 121°31′E in a shallow curve to Cape Keraudren 19°58′S 119°46′E, with its midpoint at 19°37′S 120°59′E. The beach is about 100 m wide and has a gentle gradient. It consists of sand with a high proportion of shelly material, and experiences a very large tidal range with an amplitude of up to 9 m. The adjoining tidal mudflats vary from 1 to 5 km in width. On the landward side it is bordered by dunes, a narrow floodplain and, further inland, by a strip of pindan woodland or shrubland. Most of the land along the coast is covered by four large pastoral leases: Anna Plains, Mandora, Wallal and Pardoo, which are operated principally as cattle stations.

=== Climate ===
The climate is semi-arid monsoonal with a hot wet summer and a warm dry winter. Median and mean annual rainfall are 327 mm and 341 mm respectively, with annual evaporation about 3500 mm. There is much variability in rainfall, with significant variation between years as well as the period when the bulk of the rain falls; much is contributed by tropical cyclones, especially from January to March.

== Ramsar site ==
Some 1,750 square kilometres (680 sq mi) of the beach and adjoining land, as well as the Mandora Marsh, was designated Ramsar Site 480 on 7 June 1990.

=== Eighty Mile Beach ===
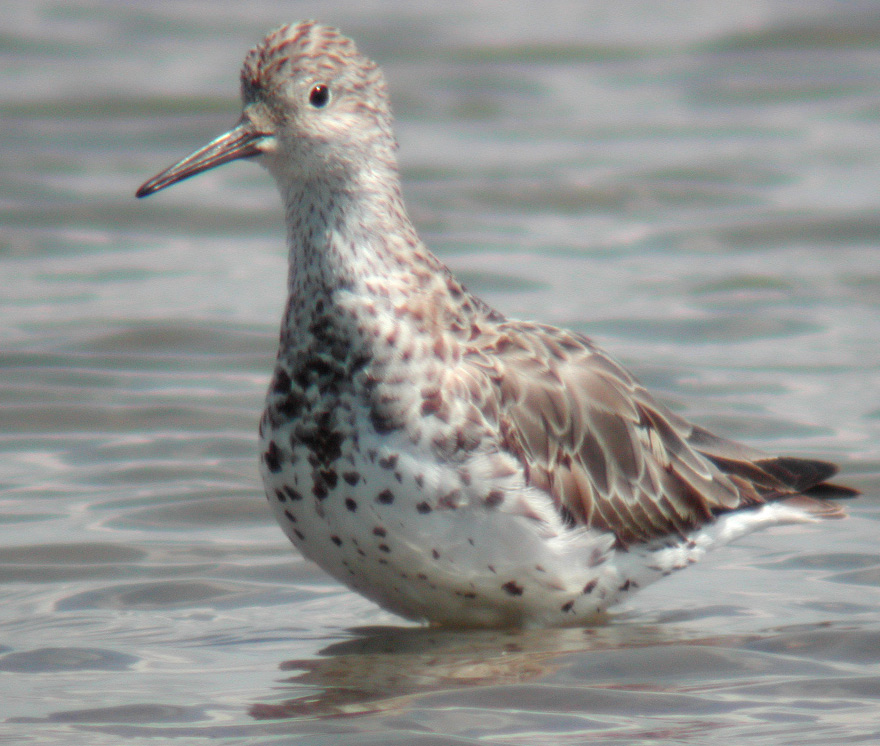
Great knot

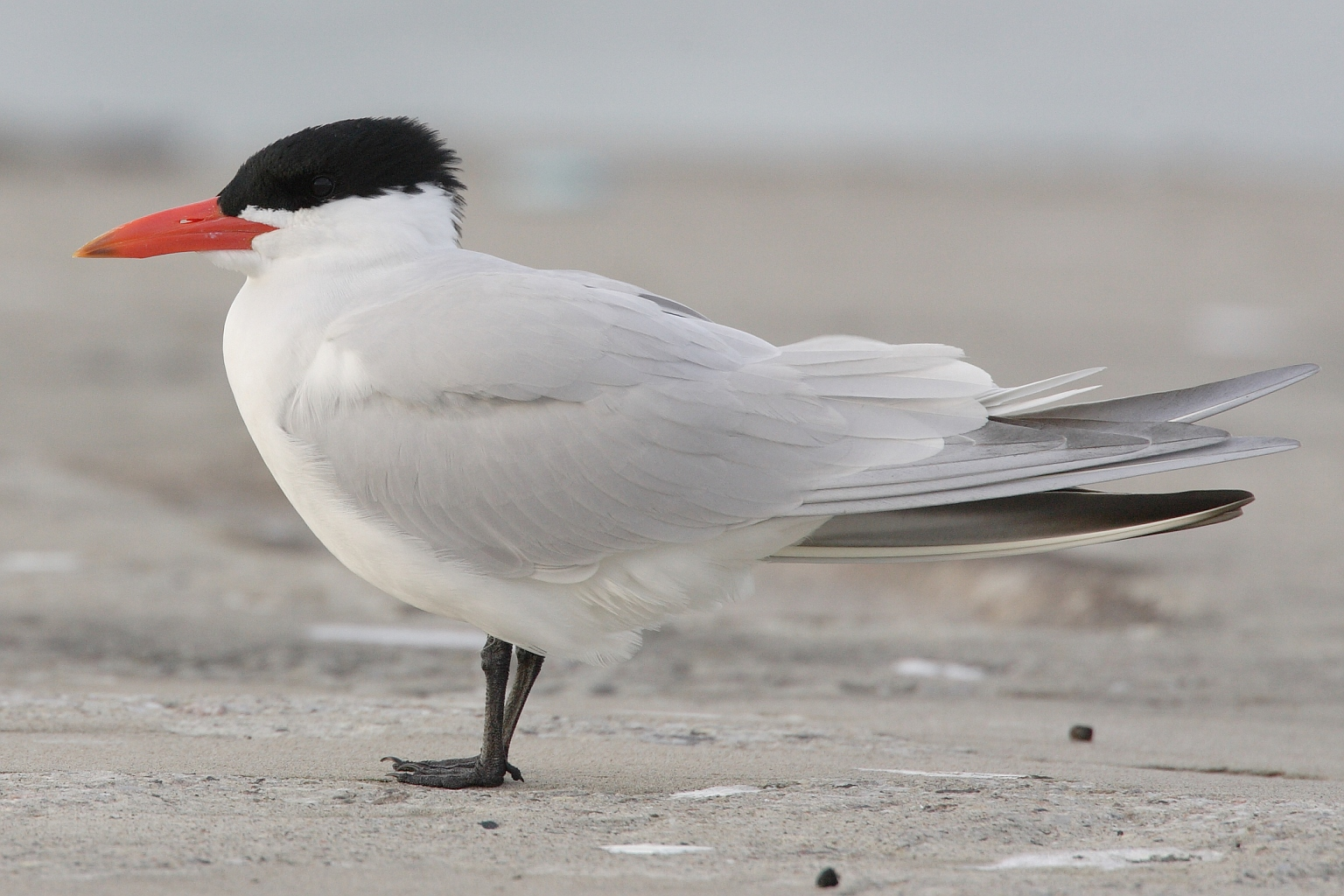
Caspian tern

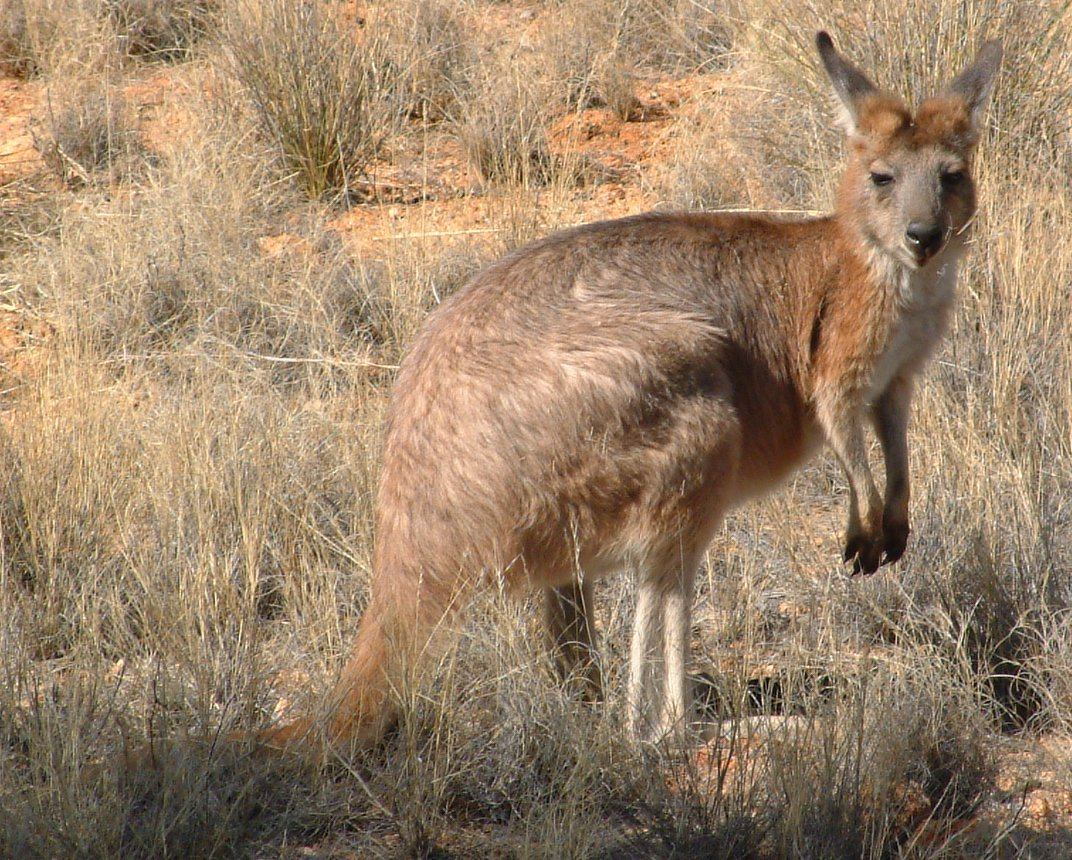
Euro, or common wallaroo

==== Flora ====
Along the beach, the primary dunes are stabilised by green birdflower and beach spinifex. Secondary parallel, calcareous dune ridges and swales commonly feature scattered dune wattle. Significant grasses include Whiteochloa airoides and the local endemic Triodia epactia, a resinous hummock-forming species. Inland grasslands have been strongly modified by intensive cattle grazing and are dominated by introduced buffel grass and birdwood grass.

==== Fauna ====
The principal conservation value of Eighty Mile Beach lies in the presence of very large numbers of shorebirds, for which it is one of the most important non-breeding and migratory stop-over areas in the East Asian – Australasian Flyway, regularly supporting more than 400,000 birds and especially important as a landfall for birds migrating southwards from their high latitude breeding grounds in northern Asia and Alaska to spend the austral summer in Australia. It is one of the most important sites in the world for the migration of great knot and it supports at least 1% of the flyway population (or 1% of the national population for non-migratory species) of 17 waders and the Caspian tern. The most abundant shorebird species at the beach are the great knot (up to 169,000 counted), bar-tailed godwit (110,000), and red knot (80,000). Other notable species include curlew sandpiper (60,000), red-necked stint (60,000), large sand plover (64,000) and Oriental plover (57,000) on the beach, sharp-tailed sandpiper (25,000) at both the beach and floodplain swamps, and little curlew (12,000) on the floodplain.

Flatback turtles nest along Eighty-mile Beach at scattered locations between October and April. Coastal plains in the southern part of Anna Plains Station are a stronghold for Australian bustards and support high densities of red kangaroos. The western part of Wallal Downs has a dense population of euros.

=== Mandora Marsh ===
Mandora Marsh, also known as the Mandora Salt Marsh, is a diverse wetland complex based on a palaeo-river system. It lies on Mandora Station, with the western end some 30 km from Eighty Mile Beach, beginning on the inland side of the Great Northern Highway, at the western edge of the Great Sandy Desert, in which bioregion it lies. Although it is included in the Eighty Mile Beach Ramsar Site, its environmental values are somewhat different.

== Tourism and access ==
Eighty Mile Beach is subject to a relatively low but increasing amount of tourism. A caravan park has been established on Wallal Downs at one of the access points to the beach, 250 km north of Port Hedland and 365 km south of Broome. It is used for fishing, seashell collecting and other beach-based recreation.
