= Anna Plains Station =

Pastoral lease in Western Australia

Coordinates: 19°15′12″S 121°29′15″E

Location in Western Australia

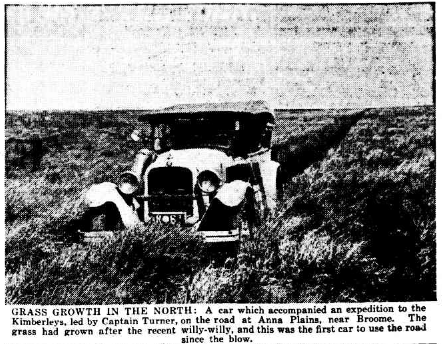
Motor car at Anna Plains in 1935

Anna Plains Station is a cattle station in the Kimberley region of Western Australia.

== Location ==
The station is situated on the Western Australian coast 250 kilometres (155 mi) south of Broome. It lies in the Shire of Broome in the Kimberley region and in the Dampierland bioregion. It is 3,600 square kilometres (1,390 sq mi) in area and runs over 20,000 head of cattle. Anna Plains is operating under the Crown Lease number CL56-1982 and has the Land Act number LA3114/1154.

== Ecology ==
The property adjoins Eighty Mile Beach, which is one of Australia's most important sites for migratory waders, and is listed under the Ramsar Convention as a wetland of international importance. That part of the station subject to periodic flooding forms part of the 3,337-square-kilometre (1,288 sq mi) Mandora Marsh and Anna Plains Important Bird Area, identified as such by BirdLife International because of its importance for supporting large numbers of waders and waterbirds.

== History ==
The traditional owners of the area is the Karajarri people to the north and the Njangamarda Kundal and Njangamarda Uparuka peoples to the south.

In 1903 the station was owned by the partners, Percy and Felde, who went to court over selling the station in 1905.

The MacRobertson Expedition visited the area in June 1928, and described the station as being over 1 million acres in extent and famed for its shorthorn cattle. It was also noted that the expedition Wireless was a source of great curiosity to the station's Indigenous employees.

Mr F. S. McMullen was the station owner in 1933. He petitioned the minister of agriculture to dispose of 10,000 head of cattle with a view to changing over to sheep. The request was made as the owner was unable to move his stock north through country infested with bush tick and new restrictions meant he was unable to move his cattle south because of pleuro-pneumonia and buffalo fly infestations.

The station was subject to heavy rains in 1934 with 9 inches (229 mm) of rain falling during the course of a storm, leaving the country under water for hundreds of miles. A passenger aeroplane flying from Port Hedland to Broome that was caught in the storm was forced to land at the station. At least 800 head were overlanded to the Meekatharra sales yard later the same year and were the first cattle in the state to be subject to the Turner test for pleuro-pneumonia prior to sale. The station was stocked with approximately 10,000 head of cattle at this time.

In 1935 a trapper, Daniel Joseph O'Brien, was found murdered near the station property. His body was exhumed from a shallow grave, as was the body of an Aboriginal man, and both were taken back to the homestead.

Following a cyclone in 1936, the station manager found the carcasses of 7 mules, 49 horses and 102 head of cattle that had been swept into the sea and drowned. During the storm it was estimated that 3.5 inches (89 mm) of rain fell; damage included several windmills being blown over and a part of the homestead being destroyed.

A drought in 1945 left the cattle in very bad condition, with many dying.

1,100 head of cattle were taken overland from the station to the railway at Meekatharra in 1948 by the drover Georg Solvay.

1,200 head of cattle from the station were loaded at Eighty Mile Beach in 1954 onto the LST landing craft Wan Kuo in the first shipment of its kind from Western Australia. The cattle were penned in batches of 15 along with about 10 tons of feed in readiness to be shipped to Manila.

In 1959 the Talgarno village was built on land excised from the station. Talgarno was a British government project to test the accuracy of Blue Streak missiles fired from Woomera. The village included housing, a hospital, swimming pools and a cinema.

A number of Indigenous people, including artist Big John Dodo and his wife Rosie Munroe, were evicted from Anna Plains in the 1960s following a change in the station's management.

On 1 February 1978, Cyclone Vern made landfall near Anna Plains with winds of about 145 km/h (90 mph), and caused flooding and minor damage in the region.

In 2010 the station was leased by the Anna Plains Cattle Company Pty Ltd. under the management of John Stoate.

== See also ==
- List of ranches and stations
- List of pastoral leases in Western Australia
