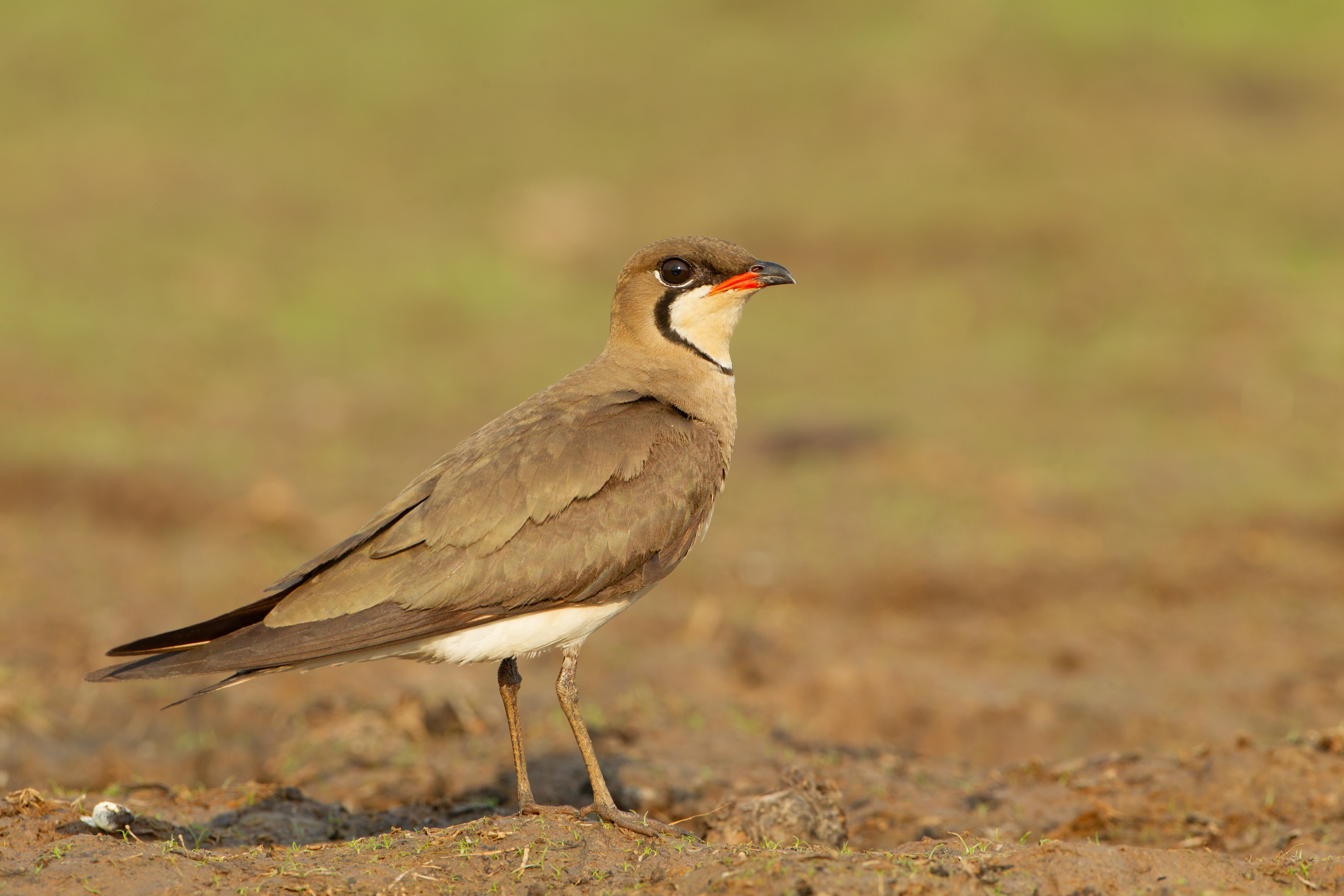
- In central Thailand

Conservation status
- Least Concern (IUCN 3.1)

Scientific classification
- Kingdom: Animalia
- Phylum: Chordata
- Class: Aves
- Order: Charadriiformes
- Family: Glareolidae
- Genus: Glareola
- Species: G. maldivarum

Binomial name
- Glareola maldivarum Forster, 1795

= Oriental pratincole =

Species of bird

Glareola maldivarum - Oriental Pratincole

The oriental pratincole (Glareola maldivarum), also known as the grasshopper-bird or swallow-plover, is a wader in the pratincole family, Glareolidae.

== Etymology ==
The genus name is a diminutive of Latin glarea, "gravel", referring to a typical nesting habitat for pratincoles. The species name, maldivarum, refers to the type locality, the ocean near the Maldive Islands. The type specimen, caught alive at sea, survived for a month on flies.

== Description ==
The Oriental pratincole has short legs, long pointed wings and long forked tails. It has a short bill, which is an adaptation to aerial feeding. The back and head are brown, and the wings are brown with black flight feathers. The belly is white and the underwings are chestnut.

Very good views are needed to distinguish the species from other pratincoles, particularly the very similar collared pratincole, which also has a chestnut underwing. The black-winged pratincole shares the black upperwing flight feathers, and lacks a white trailing edge to the wing. Those features are not always readily seen in the field, especially because the chestnut underwing appears black unless excellent views are obtained.

== Habits ==
An unusual feature of all pratincoles is that, although classed as waders, they typically hunt their insect prey on the wing like swallows, although they can also feed on the ground. The oriental praticole is a bird of open country, and they are often seen near water in the evening, hawking for insects.

== Nesting ==
They lay 2–3 eggs on the ground.

== Distribution ==
The Oriental pratincole is native to Asia, breeding from North Pakistan and the Kashmir region, and sporadically southwards towards the Maldives and Sri Lanka, Indochina, eastern China, Manchuria and the Philippines. It is migratory and winters throughout the Indomalayan realm and northern Australia.

== Vagrancy ==
They are rare north or west of their breeding range, but have been seen as far away as Great Britain more than once. The first record of a sighting in the Western Palearctic was in Suffolk, England, in June 1981. On 7 February 2004, 2.5 million oriental pratincoles were recorded by the Australasian Wader Studies Group on the Eighty Mile Beach in Australia's north-west. There had previously been no record of such a large number of birds and it is supposed that weather conditions caused much of the world's population of the species to congregate in one area.

== Gallery ==
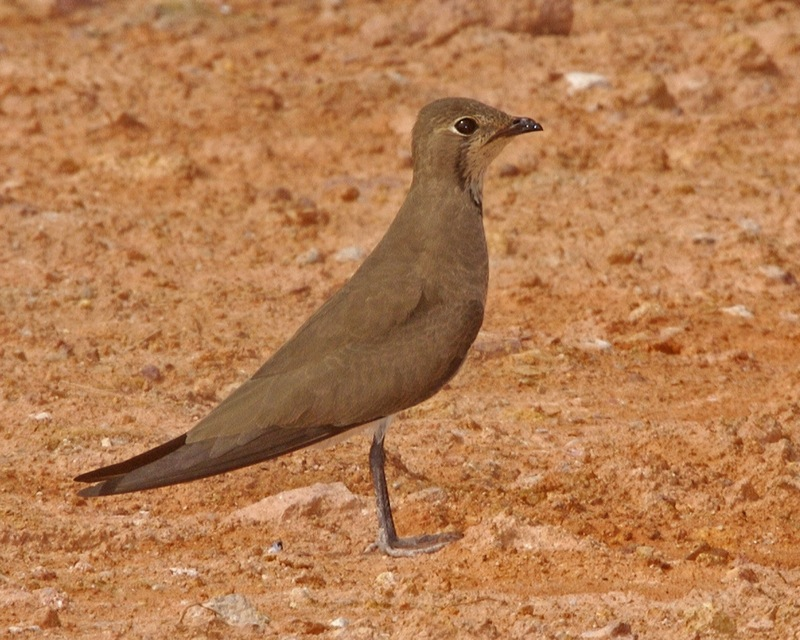
Non-breeding adult

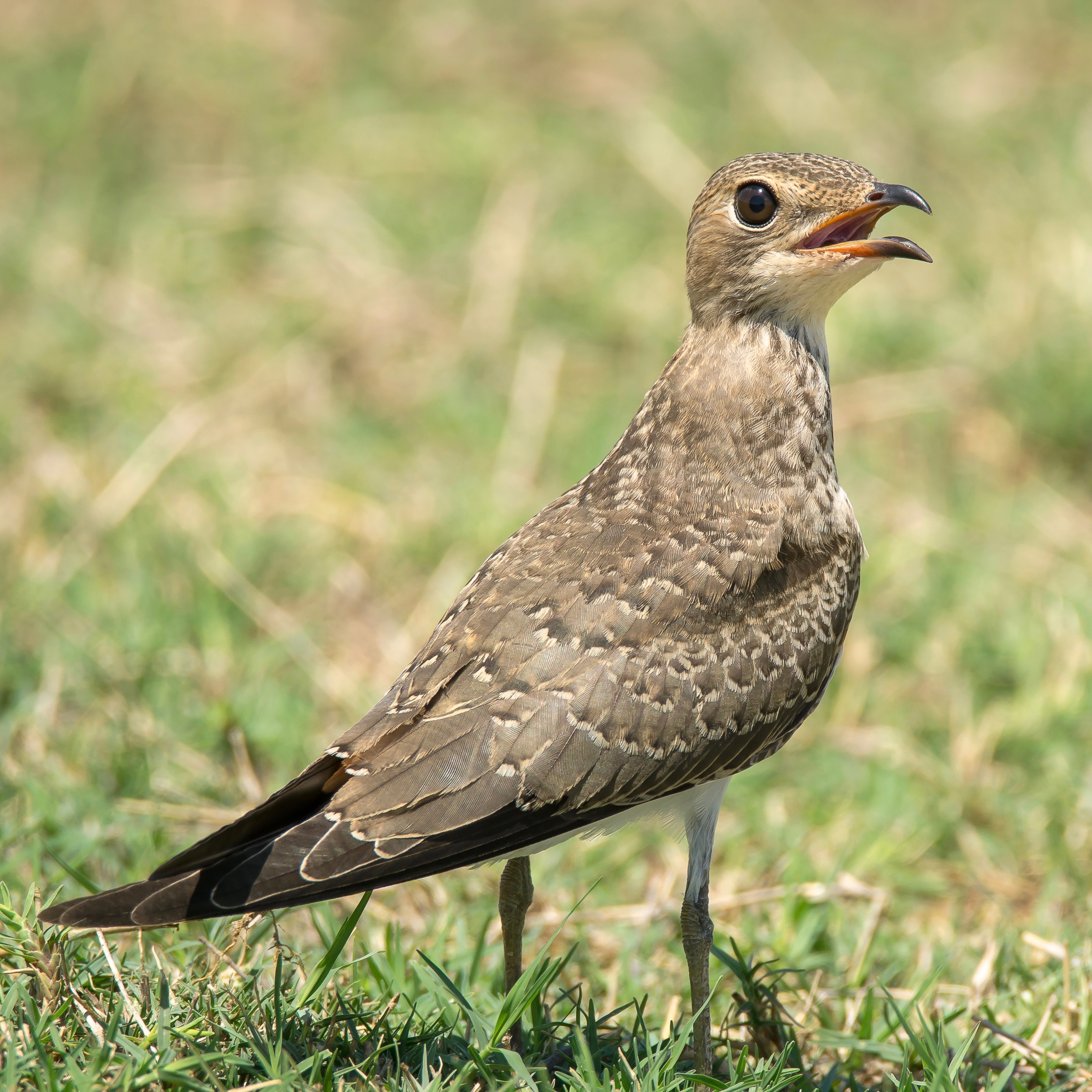
Juvenile spotted Tenneri, Tamilnadu

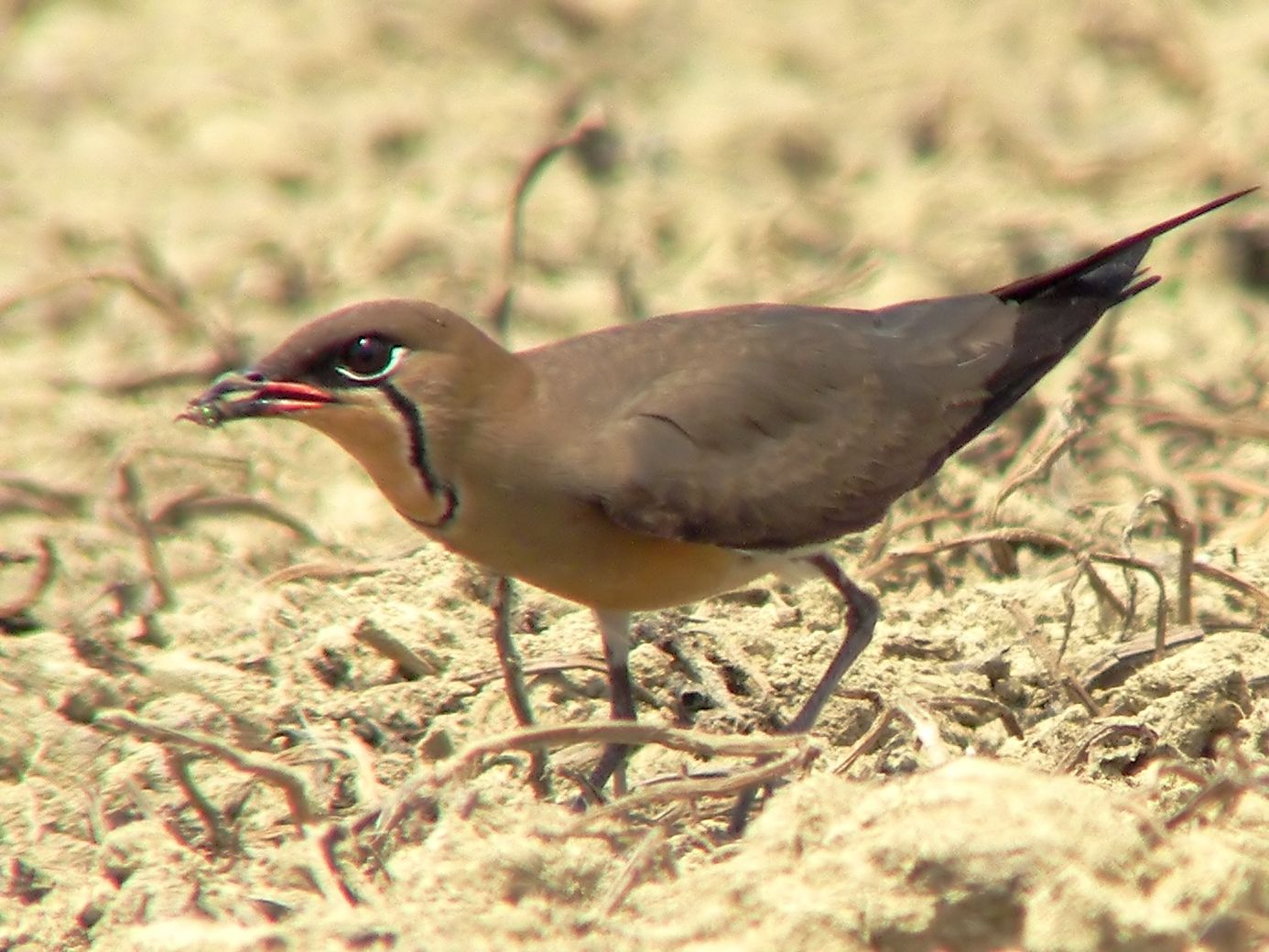
Stalking insects on the ground

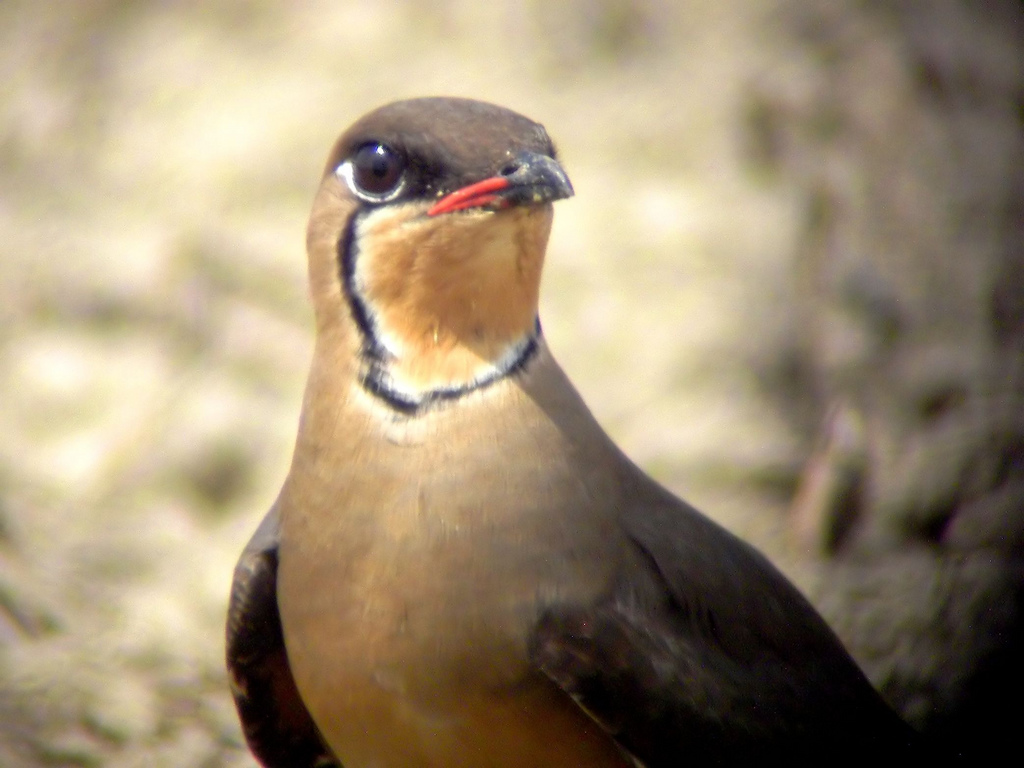
Breeding adult showing pale buffy throat patch

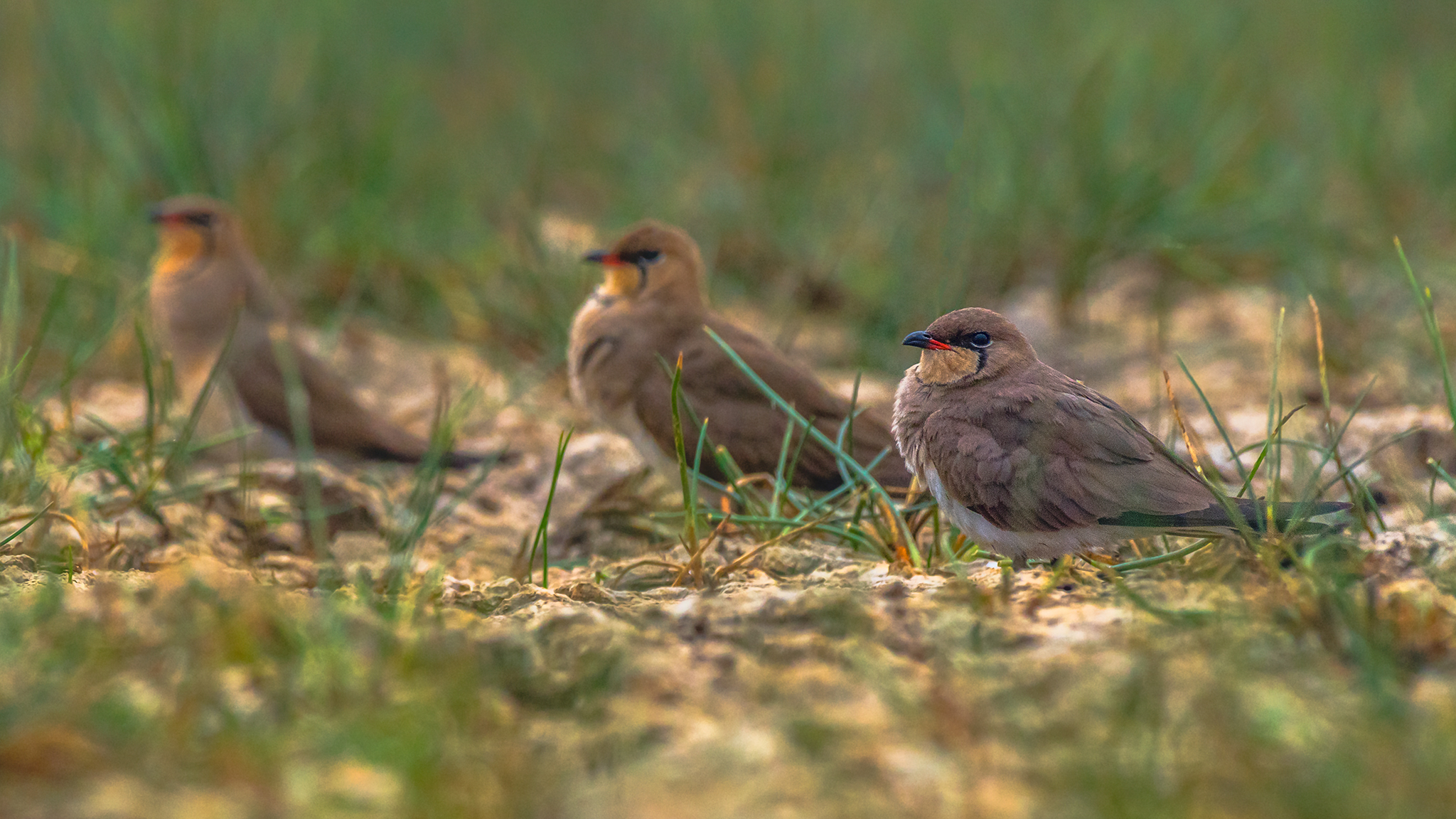
Roosting flock at Chilika Lake, coastal India

At Lockyer Waters, Queensland, Australia
