= Nyangumarta language =

Australian Aboriginal language of Western Australia

Nyangumarta
- Native to: Australia
- Region: Western Australia
- Ethnicity: Nyangumarta, Ngolibardu
- Native speakers: 240 (2021 census)
- Language family: Pama–Nyungan: Marrngu; Nyangumarta
- Dialects: Ngurlipartu; Walyirli; (Kuntal, Pijikala not distinct)

Language codes
- ISO 639-3: nna
- Glottolog: nyan1301
- AIATSIS: A61
- ELP: Nyangumarta

Nyangumarta, also written Njaŋumada, Njangamada, Njanjamarta and other variants, is a language spoken by the Nyangumarta people and other Aboriginal Australians in the region of Western Australia to the south and east of Lake Waukarlykarly, including Eighty Mile Beach, and part of the Great Sandy Desert inland to near Telfer. As of 2021 there were an estimated 240 speakers of Nyangumarta, down from a 1975 estimate of 1000.

It has two dialects: Ngurlipartu and Wanyarli. It is the most widely spoken Aboriginal language in the town of Port Hedland.

Wordlist in Nyangumarta recorded by the UCLA Phonetics Lab

== Classification ==
Nyangumarta is a member of the Marrngu branch of the Pama–Nyungan languages. The other members of this group are Mangarla and Karajarri, with which it shares features and vocabulary.

== Geographic distribution ==
=== Dialects ===
Nyangumarta has two main dialects: Ngurlipartu, spoken in the southern, inland region, and Wanyarli, spoken in the northern, coastal region.

== Phonology ==
Nyangumarta has a typical Australian phoneme inventory, with many consonant phonemes, including multiple lateral and rhotic phonemes, but few vowel phonemes.

=== Consonants ===
There are 17 consonant phonemes in Nyangumarta, with five pairs of homorganic plosives and nasals.

	Peripheral		Apical		Laminal
	Bilabial	Velar	Alveolar	Retroflex	Palatal
Obstruent	p	k	t	ʈ	c
Nasal	m	ŋ	n	ɳ	ɲ
Lateral			l	ɭ	ʎ
Rhotic			ɾ	ɻ	
Approximant	w				j

There are no voicing contrasts in Nyangmurta.

Allophones of the consonants tend to vary in manner of articulation rather than place of articulation – e.g. plosives are usually voiceless word-initially, but voiced intervocalically and following nasals, and some plosives have fricative allophones.

=== Vowels ===
There are 3 contrastive vowels in Nyangmarta.

	Front	Back
High	i	u
Low	a	

Nyangmurta does not contrast roundedness or length in vowels.

=== Syllable structure ===
Monosyllabic words are permitted in Nyangumarta, but they must be at least bimoraic, with short vowels and consonants each counting as one mora, and long vowels as two. All words must begin with a consonant, although, if the initial consonant is a glide followed by its matching vowel [i.e. a sequence of /ji/ or /wu/] the glide may be dropped by some speakers. Additionally, word-initial consonant clusters are not permitted in this language, except when a cluster is created through a process of vowel elision.

== Morphology ==
Words in Nyangumarta are generally sorted into two major word classes: nominals, which take marking for case and number, and verbs, which take marking for Tense, aspect, and mood. In addition to these two, there are also small closed classes of particles, exclamations, and clitics. As is typical of Pama-Nyungan languages, Nyangamurta uses suffixes to show case, person, number, TAM.

Nyangumarta has three numbers: singular, dual, and plural, with dual and plural 1st person marked for clusivity. Unusually for a language of the Pilbara region, Nyangumarta has pronominal suffixes that attach to the verb in addition to independent pronouns.

Many Nyangumarta verbs are so-called complex verbs, formed out of a "pre-verb" (usually a nominal) plus an inflected stem, which combine to form a verb with a new meaning

Miyul kalku-rnu
likeness keep-NFUT
'S/he remembers it.'

Janparr karri-nyi
hungry STAT-NFUT
'S/he is hungry.'

Some nominals are bound, and have no meaning independent of their use in complex verbs

Wurang karri-nyi
? STAT-NFUT
'duck out of sight'

Nyangumarta uses a split ergative system of alignment: while case marking is done on an ergative-absolutive basis, pronouns (including pronominal marking on verbs) use a nominative-accusative system

Ngaju-lu kampa-rna-rna mayi
1SG-ERG cook-NFUT-1SG.SUB vegetable.food
'I cooked the food.'

Mirtawa-jirri puliny-ju kalku-rnu pulu pulinyi
woman-DU 3DU-ERG keep-NFUT 3DU.SUB 3DU.OBJ
'Those two took care of the two women.'

Puliny mirti jarri-nyi pulu
3DU run INCH-NFUT 3DU.SUB
'Those two ran.'

Simple verbs mostly fall into two major classes, NY-class and RN-class. The NY class is intransitive and the RN class is (mostly) transitive. There are also a few verb roots that encode a semantic distinction by alternating between the classes (e.g. jupa-NY, 'diminish' and jupa-RN, 'extinguish').

Most Nyangumarta verbs are complex verbs, or verbs formed from derivation or compounding. Nyangumarta has a causative -ma-RN, an affective -ji-RN, and a verbalizer -pi-RN which adds no particular meaning to the verb. Of these, -ma-RN and -pi-RN can only be used with a nominal.

Japirr-ma-rna
lips-CAUS-NFUT
'S/he asked him.'

Jarlin-pi-rni
tongue-VB-NFUT
'S/he poked out her/his tongue.'

Lalypa-ji-rni
flat-AFF-NFUT
'S/he flattened it.'

== Clause structure ==
Nyangumarta creates subordinate clauses through nominalization of verbs. There are fundamentally two types of subordinate clause: the purpose clause and the relative clause. Purpose causes denote why or for what purpose an action occurred, and are marked by dative marking on the nominalized verb.

Jarlin kurta-rna-yi nyampa kuyi-ku warli-na-ku.
tongue emerge-NFUT-3PL.SUB quick meat-DAT hold-NM-DAT
'They make their tongue come out quickly to catch the meat/food.'

Relative clauses denote either a shared time frame (T-type relative clause) or a shared argument (NP-type relative clause) between the main and subordinate clauses, and are marked by ablative marking on the nominalized verb. Additional case markers (dative, accusative, and locative) can be added on along with the ablative to produce more specific effects.

Partany-ju jina wirrka-rna-rninyi marnti ya-ninya-ngulu
child-ERG foot cut-NFUT-REFLX walk go-NM-ABL
'The child cut his foot while walking along.'

Martuwara-ja jurti-nikinyi-yirni parlkarra-nga jarnti-na-ja-nga
dish-ABL pour-IMPF-1PL.EXC.SUB flat-LOC clear-NM-ABL-LOC
'We poured it from the dish onto the flat which is cleared.'

However, in many cases what is accomplished in other languages by subordination is accomplished in Nyangumarta with clause conjunction.
