= Nyangumarta people =

Indigenous people of Western Australia

The Nyangumarta people, also written Njaŋumada, Njangamada, Njanjamarta and other variations, are a nation of Aboriginal Australians from the northwestern coast of Western Australia. According to Norman Tindale, they are divided into two distinct branches, the Kundal and the Iparuka.

== Language ==
Nyangumarta belongs to the Marrngu branch of the Pama–Nyungan languages, together with Mangarla and Karajarri.

== Country ==
Njangumarta Kundal country extended over some 41,000 km^{2} (16,000 mi^{2}), while that of Njangumarta Iparuka comprised an estimated 23,000 km^{2} (8,700 mi^{2}). Together they encompass areas from the Great Sandy Desert south through to Eighty Mile Beach, including Pardoo Station, Wallal Downs Station and Anna Plains Station. Geoffrey O'Grady affirmed that the original extent of their lands at the beginning of white colonial penetration in their domain was 7,000 square miles (18,000 km^{2}), but that their linguistic expansion and influence had increased substantially since then.

== Present day ==
Most Nyangumarta people now live in Broome, Bidyadanga and Port Hedland, though they still regularly visit their country.

== Native title ==
Their traditional ownership of this country was recognised in 2009 by the Federal Court of Australia.

== Alternative names ==
- Njangamada, Nyangamada, Nangamada, Nangamurda, Njangomada, Njangumada
- Njangumarda, Nangumarda, Njangomada, Nyangumada, Nyangumata
- Njadamarda, Njanjamarta
- Ngapakoreilitja (northern name, "southern waters people")
- Ngardungardu (northern name, contrasting with Nganudu (southern Njaŋumada)
- Warmala (pejorative northern Njangamarda term for southerners)
- Kundal (name for northern coastal Njangamarda)
- Kundal and Waljuli Njangamarda (southern inlanders names for northern coastal Njangamarda)
- Kularupulu (name applied jointly to coastal Njangamarda and Karajarri)
- Iparuka (name used by southern bands)
- Ngapakarna (another southern endonym)
- I:baruga, Ibarga, Ibarrga, Ibargo

== Notable people ==
- Dooley Bin Bin (c. 1900 - 1982) leader of the Pilbara Strike.
- Jacob Oberdoo (c. 1920 - 1989) part of the Pilbara Strike and community leader.

== Sources ==
- "AIATSIS map of Indigenous Australia". AIATSIS. 14 May 2024.
- Davidson, D. S.; McCarthy, Frederick D. (1957). "The Distribution and Chronology of Some Important Types of Stone Implements in Western Australia". Anthropos. 52 (3/4): 390–458. JSTOR 40454078.
- "Hunter v State of Western Australia [2009] FCA 654". AustLII. 19 August 2009.
- O'Grady, Geoffrey N. (June 1957). "Statistical Investigations into an Australian Language". Oceania. 27 (4): 283–312. doi:10.1002/j.1834-4461.1957.tb00707.x. JSTOR 40329062.
- O'Grady, Geoffrey N. (1964). Nyangumarta Grammar (PDF). University of Sydney.
- Palmer, Kingsley (1991). Aborigines, values and the environment (PDF). Fundamental Questions Paper No.7. ANU Centre for Resource and Environmental Studies. ISBN 0-86740-391-8.
- Piddington, Marjorie; Piddington, Ralph (March 1932). "Report of field work in North-Western Australia". Oceania. 2 (3): 342–358. doi:10.1002/j.1834-4461.1932.tb00033.x. JSTOR 27976152.
- Piddington, Ralph (October–December 1930). "The Water-Serpent in Karadjeri Mythology". Oceania. 1 (3): 352–354. doi:10.1002/j.1834-4461.1930.tb01656.x. JSTOR 40327334.
- Sharp, Janet (2004). Nyangumarta, a language of the Pilbara region of Western Australia. Pacific Linguistics. ISBN 978-0-858-83529-0.
- "Tindale Tribal Boundaries" (PDF). Department of Aboriginal Affairs, Western Australia. September 2016.
- Tindale, Norman Barnett (1974). "Njangamarda (WA)". Aboriginal Tribes of Australia: Their Terrain, Environmental Controls, Distribution, Limits, and Proper Names. Australian National University. ISBN 978-0-708-10741-6. Archived from the original on 20 March 2020.
