= Mandora Station =

Pastoral lease in Western Australia

Coordinates: 19°44′31.66″S 120°50′37.95″E

Location in Western Australia

Mandora Station is a cattle station on the Western Australia coast south of Broome, located in the Shire of Broome. In earlier years it has also been a sheep station.

It maintains a weather station and is noted for the Mandora Marsh wetland, and for its proximity to Eighty Mile Beach, which are key stopping places for migratory birds.

Mandora crater on Mars is named after the locality; the name of the Mandurah suburb of Madora Bay was also derived from that of the station.

In 2017 the property was sold by Peter and Pol Edmunds. The Edmunds are relatives of the De Pledge family who had owned the property since the 1940s. The 94,000-hectare (232,279-acre) property stocked with 4,500 head of droughtmaster cattle was bought by the Sale family who also have an interest in Bulka, Yougawalla, and Margaret River Stations.

== Climate ==
Climate data for Mandora, Western Australia
Month	Jan	Feb	Mar	Apr	May	Jun	Jul	Aug	Sep	Oct	Nov	Dec	Year
Record high °C (°F)	46.8 (116.2)	46.7 (116.1)	45.6 (114.1)	43.6 (110.5)	39.8 (103.6)	36.6 (97.9)	36.1 (97.0)	39.6 (103.3)	42.8 (109.0)	46.8 (116.2)	47.4 (117.3)	48.4 (119.1)	48.4 (119.1)
Mean daily maximum °C (°F)	36.0 (96.8)	35.6 (96.1)	36.9 (98.4)	36.2 (97.2)	32.1 (89.8)	29.1 (84.4)	29.0 (84.2)	30.9 (87.6)	33.8 (92.8)	36.0 (96.8)	36.6 (97.9)	36.7 (98.1)	34.1 (93.4)
Mean daily minimum °C (°F)	25.4 (77.7)	24.9 (76.8)	24.0 (75.2)	20.8 (69.4)	16.9 (62.4)	14.1 (57.4)	12.5 (54.5)	13.2 (55.8)	15.7 (60.3)	19.2 (66.6)	21.9 (71.4)	24.5 (76.1)	19.4 (66.9)
Record low °C (°F)	18.8 (65.8)	15.6 (60.1)	14.5 (58.1)	11.0 (51.8)	5.7 (42.3)	3.4 (38.1)	−0.6 (30.9)	1.4 (34.5)	5.4 (41.7)	10.0 (50.0)	12.8 (55.0)	14.5 (58.1)	−0.6 (30.9)
Average precipitation mm (inches)	87.6 (3.45)	105.2 (4.14)	73.7 (2.90)	19.1 (0.75)	24.8 (0.98)	17.3 (0.68)	8.8 (0.35)	2.5 (0.10)	1.0 (0.04)	1.2 (0.05)	6.4 (0.25)	33.9 (1.33)	376.6 (14.83)
Average rainy days	4.6	4.9	3.4	1.0	1.3	1.0	0.7	0.3	0.1	0.1	0.3	1.9	19.6

== See also ==
- List of ranches and stations
