= List of homesteads in Western Australia: T–V =

This list includes all homesteads in Western Australia with a gazetted name. It is complete with respect to the 1996 Gazetteer of Australia. Dubious names have been checked against the online 2004 data, and in all cases confirmed correct. However, if any homesteads have been gazetted or deleted since 1996, this list does not reflect these changes. Strictly speaking, Australian place names are gazetted in capital letters only; the names in this list have been converted to mixed case in accordance with normal capitalisation conventions.

Name	Location	Remarks
Tabba Tabba	20°50′S 118°54′E	
Tabenup	33°45′S 117°45′E	
Tableland	17°17′S 126°54′E	
Tableup	33°21′S 117°2′E	
Tachbrook	33°23′S 116°54′E	
Taincrow	27°16′S 118°9′E	
Takalarup	34°37′S 118°3′E	
Takenup	34°48′S 118°0′E	
Talawana	22°57′S 121°11′E	
Talbot Farm	31°59′S 116°40′E	
Taldumande	34°29′S 116°56′E	
Talga Talga	21°0′S 120°4′E	
Talga Talga	21°0′S 119°49′E	
Talia	33°24′S 116°11′E	
Talisker	26°16′S 115°15′E	
Tallagandra	34°15′S 115°9′E	
Talland	33°18′S 118°54′E	
Tallangatta Outcamp	25°0′S 115°32′E	
Tallaringa	33°49′S 121°48′E	
Tallerack	33°26′S 121°17′E	
Tallering	28°23′S 115°51′E	
Tallyho	33°52′S 115°7′E	
Talval Outcamp	26°43′S 118°41′E	
Tamala	26°42′S 113°43′E	
Tamar	34°52′S 118°7′E	
Tamar Hills	32°10′S 117°40′E	
Tamaton	31°12′S 116°55′E	
Tambellelup	34°3′S 117°42′E	
Tambellicup	34°17′S 116°58′E	
Tambo Parkland	34°30′S 117°35′E	
Tambourah	21°45′S 119°11′E	
Tambrey	30°36′S 115°38′E	
Tamgaree	34°21′S 118°32′E	
Tammar Grove	33°50′S 117°51′E	
Tanami	33°28′S 118°38′E	
Tanda	22°56′S 114°46′E	
Tandara	29°47′S 116°1′E	
Tangadee	24°25′S 118°56′E	
Tangle Wood	33°33′S 115°54′E	
Tanjanerup	33°58′S 115°47′E	
Tank Farm	31°40′S 116°47′E	
Tanridge	33°48′S 115°14′E	
Tantanoola	34°0′S 118°54′E	
Tara	34°48′S 118°1′E	
Tara	32°56′S 117°3′E	
Tarbunkenup	33°58′S 118°25′E	
Tardie	27°3′S 116°21′E	
Taripta	34°22′S 117°37′E	
Tarkarri	34°0′S 118°43′E	
Tarmoola	28°43′S 121°9′E	
Tarnup	34°47′S 118°13′E	
Tarra Tarra	29°48′S 115°15′E	
Tarradale	30°38′S 116°3′E	
Tarup Creek	33°49′S 117°1′E	
Tarwilli	33°41′S 116°52′E	
Tarwonga	33°11′S 116°54′E	
Tassajara	34°3′S 117°49′E	
Tatiara	33°43′S 121°50′E	
Tatiara Downs	33°13′S 121°17′E	
Taunton Vale	33°23′S 115°44′E	
Taurus	34°47′S 117°36′E	
Tavistock	33°13′S 119°48′E	
Tawarra	31°28′S 115°56′E	
Taworri	33°46′S 118°28′E	
Taworri	34°35′S 118°14′E	
Te Rakau	30°38′S 116°23′E	
Te-anaa	34°17′S 117°8′E	
Te-rawhiti	33°58′S 118°20′E	
Teano	33°25′S 121°33′E	
Teddington	33°48′S 118°1′E	
Teddington	34°38′S 117°26′E	
Tee Tree Downs	31°23′S 115°57′E	
Teen Challenge	31°21′S 115°41′E	
Telara	29°7′S 115°27′E	
Telstar	31°12′S 116°11′E	
Telyarup	33°53′S 117°55′E	
Temple Farm	33°44′S 117°19′E	
Ten N	30°0′S 115°13′E	
Tennisdale	33°45′S 117°22′E	
Tenseldam	34°19′S 118°56′E	
Tenterden	34°25′S 117°23′E	
Tepinga West	34°14′S 117°28′E	
Tera-mar	34°44′S 117°52′E	
Teralja	32°18′S 118°11′E	
Terama	34°25′S 118°36′E	
Terandra	33°23′S 119°38′E	
Terang	31°7′S 115°46′E	
Terra Donna	28°34′S 114°57′E	
Terrigal	33°42′S 115°13′E	
Terry-lyn Stud	33°43′S 115°12′E	
Tetlowes Outcamp	25°21′S 115°12′E	
Texarkana	30°31′S 115°38′E	
Texas Downs	17°1′S 128°28′E	
Thangoo	18°11′S 122°21′E	
Tharwa	34°33′S 118°24′E	
The Acre	33°32′S 115°41′E	
The Barracks	32°8′S 116°50′E	
The Beaufort	33°32′S 117°3′E	
The Beef Machine	33°45′S 122°22′E	
The Berry Farm	34°0′S 115°12′E	
The Billabong	32°18′S 117°58′E	
The Block	33°30′S 119°50′E	
The Bridge	33°31′S 115°38′E	
The Brook	33°49′S 117°7′E	
The Byreen	31°20′S 116°29′E	
The Chaparral	34°49′S 117°51′E	
The Clyde	33°53′S 117°0′E	
The Copse	34°18′S 115°9′E	
The Dale	28°58′S 114°49′E	
The Dene	34°36′S 117°26′E	
The Farmhouse	33°41′S 115°2′E	
The Folly Outcamp	28°19′S 120°30′E	
The Four Winds	31°38′S 116°43′E	
The Glen	33°46′S 117°23′E	
The Glen	33°51′S 116°6′E	
The Glen	34°32′S 117°5′E	
The Glen	33°5′S 116°55′E	
The Grange	33°40′S 117°29′E	
The Grange	29°14′S 115°2′E	
The Grange	33°41′S 117°48′E	
The Grass Patch Farm	33°14′S 121°44′E	
The Grove	33°39′S 117°54′E	
The Growing Concern	33°37′S 122°26′E	
The Gunyah	33°15′S 115°46′E	
The Hill	33°36′S 115°5′E	
The Hillocks	34°3′S 115°7′E	
The Homestead	34°11′S 117°24′E	
The Homestead	34°59′S 118°3′E	
The Homestead	33°47′S 115°57′E	
The Jams Farm	29°2′S 115°15′E	
The Lakes	33°32′S 117°16′E	
The Lazy R	32°15′S 118°14′E	
The Long Blackboy	34°18′S 115°13′E	
The Mallets	33°25′S 117°16′E	
The Meadows	32°10′S 116°59′E	
The Meadows	33°56′S 117°22′E	
The Meadows	31°40′S 116°44′E	
The Monastry	33°14′S 115°47′E	
The Morrell	33°32′S 117°31′E	
The New Forest	33°40′S 115°15′E	
The Nook	31°32′S 116°25′E	
The Oaks	33°30′S 117°56′E	
The Old 400	33°50′S 115°57′E	
The Paddock	33°23′S 115°40′E	
The Pines	34°58′S 117°53′E	
The Pines	31°43′S 116°44′E	
The Pinnacles	31°15′S 115°37′E	
The Ponderosa	33°43′S 115°52′E	
The Ranch	31°33′S 116°8′E	
The Ranch	34°4′S 117°26′E	
The Ranch	34°55′S 117°13′E	
The Range	22°16′S 115°24′E	
The Range	31°32′S 116°31′E	
The Reste	33°54′S 117°34′E	
The Rock	31°25′S 117°32′E	
The Scented Garden	33°54′S 115°12′E	
The Spring	33°32′S 115°41′E	
The Springs	34°46′S 117°29′E	
The Sticks	33°22′S 119°45′E	
The Valley	33°49′S 122°27′E	
The Villa	32°47′S 117°44′E	
The Wells	33°2′S 116°39′E	
The Willows	33°46′S 115°59′E	
The Willows	31°5′S 115°50′E	
The Willows	33°26′S 115°45′E	
The Yates	33°15′S 121°43′E	
Theda	14°49′S 126°43′E	
Thelmere	29°47′S 116°9′E	
Thirlmere	33°30′S 115°38′E	
Three Brooks	33°56′S 116°17′E	
Three Rivers	25°8′S 119°9′E	
Three Springs	33°20′S 116°4′E	
Thulefarm	32°42′S 117°52′E	
Thundelarra	28°54′S 117°8′E	
Thunder Gulla	34°5′S 115°6′E	
Tiarri	33°11′S 118°47′E	
Tibradden	28°45′S 114°54′E	
Tibvale	29°25′S 116°35′E	
Tickeroo	30°54′S 115°45′E	
Tillellan	33°18′S 117°19′E	
Tillerup	35°1′S 117°30′E	
Tilsdown	33°46′S 117°3′E	
Timaru	31°29′S 115°55′E	
Timaru	32°3′S 117°5′E	
Timberfield	30°49′S 120°10′E	
Tinganup	33°34′S 117°52′E	
Tingleview	34°57′S 116°56′E	
Tinkelelup	34°39′S 118°30′E	
Tipperary	31°48′S 116°48′E	
Tirana Villa	31°11′S 116°4′E	
Tirang	31°20′S 115°53′E	
Tiree	32°38′S 116°54′E	
Tjawupalya	26°3′S 128°15′E	
Tolarno	31°35′S 116°35′E	
Tolgamine	31°35′S 116°52′E	
Tombstone Rocks	30°41′S 115°15′E	
Tondarup	33°59′S 117°15′E	
Toni Willows	34°29′S 117°13′E	
Tooarvee	32°43′S 117°25′E	
Toocalup	34°24′S 119°7′E	
Toojelup	33°35′S 117°5′E	
Toolang	32°40′S 117°40′E	
Toolibut	34°16′S 118°32′E	
Toorackie	33°10′S 116°59′E	
Toorangie	32°23′S 117°17′E	
Tootra	30°34′S 116°26′E	
Top End	33°4′S 116°45′E	
Top House	32°50′S 117°31′E	
Torakuni	33°23′S 121°8′E	
Torbling	32°58′S 117°9′E	
Torr Shamba	34°18′S 115°1′E	
Torridon	33°39′S 115°51′E	
Tourello	32°35′S 117°28′E	
Towera	23°11′S 115°7′E	
Towerrining	33°34′S 116°48′E	
Townsend	34°44′S 117°46′E	
Towrana	25°26′S 115°14′E	
Tralee	29°10′S 116°0′E	
Trap Well	31°25′S 116°43′E	
Trastevere	33°49′S 115°3′E	
Treeforis	33°45′S 115°16′E	
Treendale	33°18′S 115°46′E	
Treeton Park	33°49′S 115°14′E	
Treevale	30°30′S 115°50′E	
Treeville	32°15′S 118°20′E	
Trekenner	33°55′S 117°53′E	
Trelawney	31°58′S 118°25′E	
Trevina	30°30′S 116°4′E	
Trewlawney	31°38′S 116°43′E	
Triangulee	33°30′S 116°28′E	
Trignell	33°30′S 115°42′E	
Trillbar	25°35′S 117°45′E	
Triple View	34°38′S 118°9′E	
Tristania	33°42′S 115°26′E	
Troy	33°4′S 115°54′E	
Tuart Park	29°3′S 114°51′E	
Tullibardine	34°39′S 118°21′E	
Tumbalea	34°56′S 117°37′E	
Tummaluk	31°28′S 116°39′E	
Tumut	30°55′S 115°40′E	
Tundra	34°57′S 117°12′E	
Turee Creek	23°37′S 118°39′E	
Turipa	29°56′S 116°7′E	
Turner	17°50′S 128°17′E	
Turner Brook Farm	34°16′S 115°4′E	
Turners Gully	32°20′S 116°44′E	
Turramurra	34°41′S 117°44′E	
Turramurra	33°31′S 115°50′E	
Turva	33°27′S 116°8′E	
Tutomoney Park	31°49′S 116°58′E	
Tuyali	30°38′S 115°30′E	
Twelve Trees	33°52′S 117°22′E	
Twin Hills	29°40′S 115°22′E	
Twin Oaks	33°36′S 115°52′E	
Twin Peaks	27°23′S 115°58′E	
Twin Ridges	32°23′S 117°56′E	
Twitcham	34°36′S 117°24′E	
Two Rivers	33°50′S 117°18′E	
Two Valleys	33°51′S 117°22′E	
Two Wells	33°56′S 117°51′E	
Twow View	34°49′S 117°54′E	
Tynedale	33°20′S 115°54′E	
Tyrone	33°31′S 116°39′E	
Tyrone Park	32°15′S 118°20′E	
Uaremba	33°36′S 121°26′E	
Uaroo	22°47′S 115°22′E	
Ucarro	33°46′S 117°27′E	
Udale	29°47′S 115°21′E	
Udialla	17°57′S 123°44′E	
Ukang	34°0′S 117°3′E	
Ularnup	33°49′S 117°26′E	
Ulinga	33°40′S 120°31′E	
Ullaring	31°32′S 116°51′E	
Ullawarra	23°29′S 116°7′E	
Ullenwood	33°10′S 121°29′E	
Ulunging	32°4′S 117°34′E	
Umuna	32°18′S 116°43′E	
Undara	33°55′S 119°8′E	
Undara	32°52′S 116°24′E	
Ups'n Downs	33°17′S 119°55′E	
Upsan Downs	29°41′S 116°7′E	
Upsan Estate	33°37′S 117°5′E	
Upsan-downs	33°5′S 119°24′E	
Upson Downs	33°12′S 119°54′E	
Upson Downs	33°35′S 115°35′E	
Upwood	33°42′S 117°1′E	
Uradale	33°59′S 116°40′E	
Urala	21°46′S 114°49′E	
Uralla	32°13′S 117°9′E	
Uralla	33°55′S 115°47′E	
Uralla	33°11′S 119°51′E	
Uralla	33°58′S 116°5′E	
Uralla Bouverie	34°42′S 117°27′E	
Urandy Creek Outcamp	22°17′S 116°17′E	
Urara	33°31′S 119°37′E	
Urarey	27°28′S 122°20′E	
Urella	29°3′S 115°24′E	
Utopia	31°18′S 115°36′E	
Valencia	33°34′S 115°53′E	
Valereena	31°38′S 116°5′E	
Valhalla	33°15′S 119°24′E	
Valley View	33°37′S 117°5′E	
Valley View	31°19′S 116°9′E	
Vardo	34°7′S 115°8′E	
Vearnlea	29°59′S 115°7′E	
Ventonia	33°18′S 115°48′E	
Ventura	33°28′S 116°41′E	
Veperey	33°41′S 122°20′E	
Veray	31°39′S 116°3′E	
Vernlea	33°31′S 115°42′E	
Victor Park	33°36′S 121°54′E	
Victoria Downs	32°59′S 117°18′E	
Viewbank	33°15′S 115°51′E	
Viewlands	33°2′S 117°23′E	
Villa Garda	33°36′S 115°36′E	
Vinci	33°43′S 115°54′E	
Vinup	33°33′S 117°3′E	
Virginia	33°58′S 118°1′E	
Vivigani	33°41′S 120°35′E	
Vulcan Downs	34°59′S 117°11′E	

== See also ==
- List of pastoral leases in Western Australia
