= Bidyadanga Community =

Aboriginal community in Western Australia

Bidyadanga
- Town
- Coordinates: 18.68442°S 121.77748°E
- Country: Australia
- State: Western Australia
- LGA: Shire of Broome
- Location: 190 km (120 mi) S of Broome, Western Australia

Government
  - State electorate: Kimberley
  - Federal division: Durack

Population
  - Total: 555 (2016 census)
- Postcode: 6725

Bidyadanga, also known as La Grange, is the largest Aboriginal community in Western Australia, with a population of approximately 750 residents. It is located 180 kilometres (110 mi) south of Broome and 1,590 kilometres (990 mi) from the state capital Perth, in the Kimberley region. The traditional owners of the land are the Karajarri people, but is also home to the several other language groups.

Started as a government rations distribution point by the government in 1903, La Grange became a mission station run by German Pallotine missionaries in 1955, before the formation of Bidyadanga Aboriginal Community La Grange (BACLG) in 1975, and subsequent independence from the mission in 1982.

== Community ==
It is the largest Aboriginal community in the state and supports a population of approximately 750 people. The community has been involved in publications of local stories.

=== Governance ===
The Bidyadanga Aboriginal Community La Grange (BACLG) was incorporated in 1975 as a not-for-profit organisation to administer government-funded programs. It was incorporated under the Aboriginal Communities Act 1979 (WA).

=== Town planning ===
Bidyadanga Layout Plan No.3 was prepared in accordance with WA State Planning Policy 3.2 (Aboriginal Settlements). It was endorsed by the community on 15 November 2012 and the Western Australian Planning Commission on 28 May 2013.

== History ==
=== Early years ===
Located on Thangoo Station south of Broome, La Grange had been a government rations distribution post for Karajarri and Ngungamada people. Being in the pearling region, there was much contact between Asian pearling crews and local Aboriginal women. In 1903 and a constable and tracker were stationed there. The WA administration prevented the local Salesians from establishing a mission there. During World War II, German Pallottines made enquiries, but Germans were not allowed on the coast by the Australian Army. In late 1948, desert people from Udialla were moved there by the government, and plans for a children's institution were mooted.

In the 1950s, after two lay missionaries had started a school, Frankfurt anthropologists Helmut Petri and his wife Dr Gisela Odermann began to conduct fieldwork at La Grange. In January 1956 the Pallottines, presided over by Fr. Hügel, took charge of the mission, and dormitories, a dining hall, hospital and other buildings were built. Other missionaries joined them, and prayers, a collection of Bible stories, and an outline of kinship terms were published in the local languages. It was considered an "enlightened" mission.

In 1964 the mission was devastated by Cyclone Bessie, which destroyed the school, the hospital and all of the huts. The mission was financed and rebuilt by a combination of various Catholic funds and the Department of Native Affairs.

By 1981 there were about 400 persons living at La Grange. In 1982 the community asked for independence from the mission, and after the 1983 Seaman Aboriginal Land inquiry, the Bidyadanga Aboriginal Community asked for the mission land to be transferred to them.

=== Native title ===
In 2002 and 2004 the Karajarri had their native title rights and interests recognised, over 31,000 square kilometres (12,000 mi^{2}) – about half the size of Tasmania – in the West Kimberley. On 12 December 2002 the case known as "John Dudu Nangkiriny & Others on behalf of the Karajarri People v The State of Western Australia & Others", or "Karajarri People (Area A)" (ref. WCD2002/001) determined that native title exists in the entire area.

The claim to Area B was finalised on 8 September 2004, with "Nangkiriny v State of Western Australia [2004], FCA 1156", when it was determined that native title existed in parts of Area B only, giving the Karajarri non-exclusive native title rights over the land and waters in this area.

== Climate ==
Bidyadanga has a hot semi-arid climate (Köppen BSh) with a short and extremely variable wet season from December to March and a long, hot, and generally rainless dry season from April to November. The wet season is sweltering and humid though generally dry, but there are occasional extremely heavy downpours from tropical cyclones or other closed depressions developing from the monsoon trough to the north. The variability of rainfall in this season is extreme, as seen by the fact that only 55.1 millimetres or 2.17 inches fell in the wet season of 1923–24, but as much as 1,229.8 millimetres or 48.42 inches between December 1999 and March 2000. The highest daily rainfall on record has been 286.0 millimetres (11.26 in) on 17 February 2018, followed by 253.0 millimetres (9.96 in) on 19 March 1935. The dry season ranges from sweltering to merely hot in the afternoon, whilst mornings at the height of the dry season are pleasant and the very low humidity makes the heat less unpleasant.

Bidyadanga received Australia's highest May temperature of 40.6 °C (105.1 °F) on 6 May 1990 (as of May 2018).

Climate data for Bidyadanga, Western Australia
Month	Jan	Feb	Mar	Apr	May	Jun	Jul	Aug	Sep	Oct	Nov	Dec	Year
Record high °C (°F)	45.7 (114.3)	45.0 (113.0)	44.0 (111.2)	42.8 (109.0)	40.6 (105.1)	36.2 (97.2)	36.3 (97.3)	40.0 (104.0)	42.4 (108.3)	45.2 (113.4)	46.5 (115.7)	47.0 (116.6)	47.0 (116.6)
Mean daily maximum °C (°F)	34.4 (93.9)	34.1 (93.4)	35.4 (95.7)	35.7 (96.3)	32.5 (90.5)	29.8 (85.6)	29.6 (85.3)	31.1 (88.0)	32.9 (91.2)	34.4 (93.9)	35.0 (95.0)	35.0 (95.0)	33.3 (91.9)
Mean daily minimum °C (°F)	26.0 (78.8)	25.6 (78.1)	24.9 (76.8)	22.1 (71.8)	18.4 (65.1)	15.5 (59.9)	14.1 (57.4)	14.9 (58.8)	17.6 (63.7)	21.2 (70.2)	24.1 (75.4)	25.8 (78.4)	20.8 (69.4)
Record low °C (°F)	18.0 (64.4)	16.7 (62.1)	17.8 (64.0)	11.7 (53.1)	8.6 (47.5)	3.9 (39.0)	3.9 (39.0)	5.0 (41.0)	7.1 (44.8)	8.9 (48.0)	16.3 (61.3)	17.0 (62.6)	3.9 (39.0)
Average rainfall mm (inches)	129.1 (5.08)	139.5 (5.49)	94.9 (3.74)	25.0 (0.98)	25.0 (0.98)	19.6 (0.77)	8.2 (0.32)	2.3 (0.09)	1.3 (0.05)	1.2 (0.05)	7.6 (0.30)	59.1 (2.33)	512.8 (20.18)
Average rainy days	6.3	6.2	4.5	1.3	1.4	1.1	0.5	0.3	0.1	0.2	0.6	2.6	25.1
Average afternoon relative humidity (%)	65	67	59	46	42	39	37	37	45	54	57	62	51

== See also ==
- List of Aboriginal communities in Western Australia
