= Mangarla language =

Australian Aboriginal language

Mangarla
- Mangala
- Native to: Australia
- Region: Western Australia
- Ethnicity: Mangala people
- Native speakers: 68 (2016 census)
- Language family: Pama–Nyungan: Marrngu; Mangarla
- Dialects: Juwarliny

Language codes
- ISO 639-3: mem
- Glottolog: mang1383
- AIATSIS: A65
- ELP: Mangala
- Mangarla is classified as Critically Endangered by the UNESCO Atlas of the World's Languages in Danger.

Mangarla, also spelt Mangala, is a Pama–Nyungan language of Western Australia. It is spoken by the Mangarla people of the north-western area of the Great Sandy Desert, inland from the coast.

== Phonology ==
Mangarla's phoneme inventory is typical of Australian languages, and is identical to the inventories of the other Marrngu languages. There are 17 consonant phonemes.

=== Consonants ===
| | Apical | | Laminal | Peripheral | |
| | Alveolar | Retroflex | Palatal | Bilabial | Velar |
|---|---|---|---|---|---|
| Obstruents | t | ʈ | ɟ | p | k |
| Nasals | n | ɳ | ɲ | m | ŋ |
| Laterals | l | ɭ | ʎ | | |
| Approximants | | ɻ | | | w |
| Tap/Trill | ɾ~r | | | | |

Apical stops in the intervocalic position are sometimes realized as taps.

=== Vowels ===
Also typical of Australian languages, there are only three vowel phonemes.

| | Front | Back |
|---|---|---|
| High | i | u |
| Low | a | |

/i, u, a/ in unstressed syllables may be heard as [ɪ, ʊ, ə]. All three vowels may be realized as [ə] in unstressed syllables.
