= Marrngu languages =

Branch of the Pama–Nyungan language family

Marrngu
- Geographic distribution: Western Australia
- Linguistic classification: Pama–Nyungan: Desert Nyungic; Marrngu

Language codes
- Glottolog: marr1265
- Marrngu languages (green) among other Pama–Nyungan (tan). Marrngu proper is on the coast, Mangarla inland.

The Marrngu languages are a branch of the Pama–Nyungan language family of Australia.

There are four members of the family, which all originated in Western Australia.

- Marrngu
  - Mangala (Mangarla)
  - Marrngu proper
    - Karajarri (Garadjari)
    - Nyangumarta (Njangumarta)

== Vocabulary ==
Capell (1940) lists the following basic vocabulary items for the Marrngu languages:

gloss	Njängumada	Garadjeri	Mangala
man	marŋu	marŋo	djiːbi
woman	midawa	djando	malar
head	djudju	guŋgulu	djida
eye	bani	bani	mil
nose	milja	milja	milja
mouth	rira	djawa	rira
tongue	djälin	djälan	djalan
stomach	ŋaːlu	ŋaːlu	burma
bone	ŋandi		gamari
blood	gunbulu	gunbulu	gunbulu
kangaroo	bardjanin	bardjanin	wandjiri
opossum	laŋgur	laŋgur	laŋgur
emu	galaju	bidjaɖa	ganaŋandja
crow	djawari	djawari	waŋgede
fly	wɔdei	wanmin	wanmin
sun	djandja	baːra	baːra
moon	ɖaɖaɖa	ɖaɖaɖa	gilinman
fire	wiga	djuŋgu	waɭu
smoke	baɳɖi	ŋuɽun	ŋundjir
water	ŋaba	ŋaba	ŋaba
