= Garadjari language =

Australian Aboriginal language

Garadjari
- Karajarri
- Region: Western Australia
- Ethnicity: Karajarri
- Native speakers: 41 (2016 census)
- Language family: Pama–Nyungan: Marrngu; Garadjari
- Dialects: Najanaja (Murrkut/Murgud); Nawurtu (Naurdu); Nangu
- Writing system: Latin

Language codes
- ISO 639-3: gbd
- Glottolog: kara1476
- AIATSIS: A64
- ELP: Karajarri
- Karajarri is classified as Critically Endangered by the UNESCO Atlas of the World's Languages in Danger.

Garadjari (Karajarri, many other spellings; see below) is an Australian Aboriginal language spoken by the Karajarri people. The language is a member of the Marrngu subgroup of the Pama-Nyungan family. It is spoken along the coast of northwestern Australia.

== Name ==
The name has many spelling variants, including:

- Garadjari (used by A Grammar of Garadjari)
- Garadjiri
- Garadyari
- Garadyaria
- Gard'are
- Karadjeri (used by Ethnologue)
- Karajarri (used by the Handbook of Western Australian Aboriginal languages and is the spelling selected by the Karajarri people for their native title claims)
- Karatjarri (used by Australian Languages)
- Karatyarri
- Karrajarra
- Karrajarri

Kurajarra / Guradjara is sometimes confused with Garadjari, but it appears to have been a separate language.

== Phoneme inventory ==
Garadjari's phoneme inventory is typical of Australian languages, and is identical to the inventories of the other Marrngu languages. There are 17 consonant phonemes.

	Peripheral		Apical		Laminal
	Bilabial	Velar	Alveolar	Retroflex	Palatal
Obstruents	p	k	t	ʈ	ɟ
Nasals	m	ŋ	n	ɳ	ɲ
Laterals			l	ɭ	ʎ
Rhotics			ɾ	ɻ	
Approximants	w				j

Also typical of Australian languages, there are only three vowel phonemes.

	Front	Back
High	i	u
Low	a	
