= Cyclone Rusty =

Category 4 Australian region cyclone in 2013

Severe Tropical Cyclone Rusty
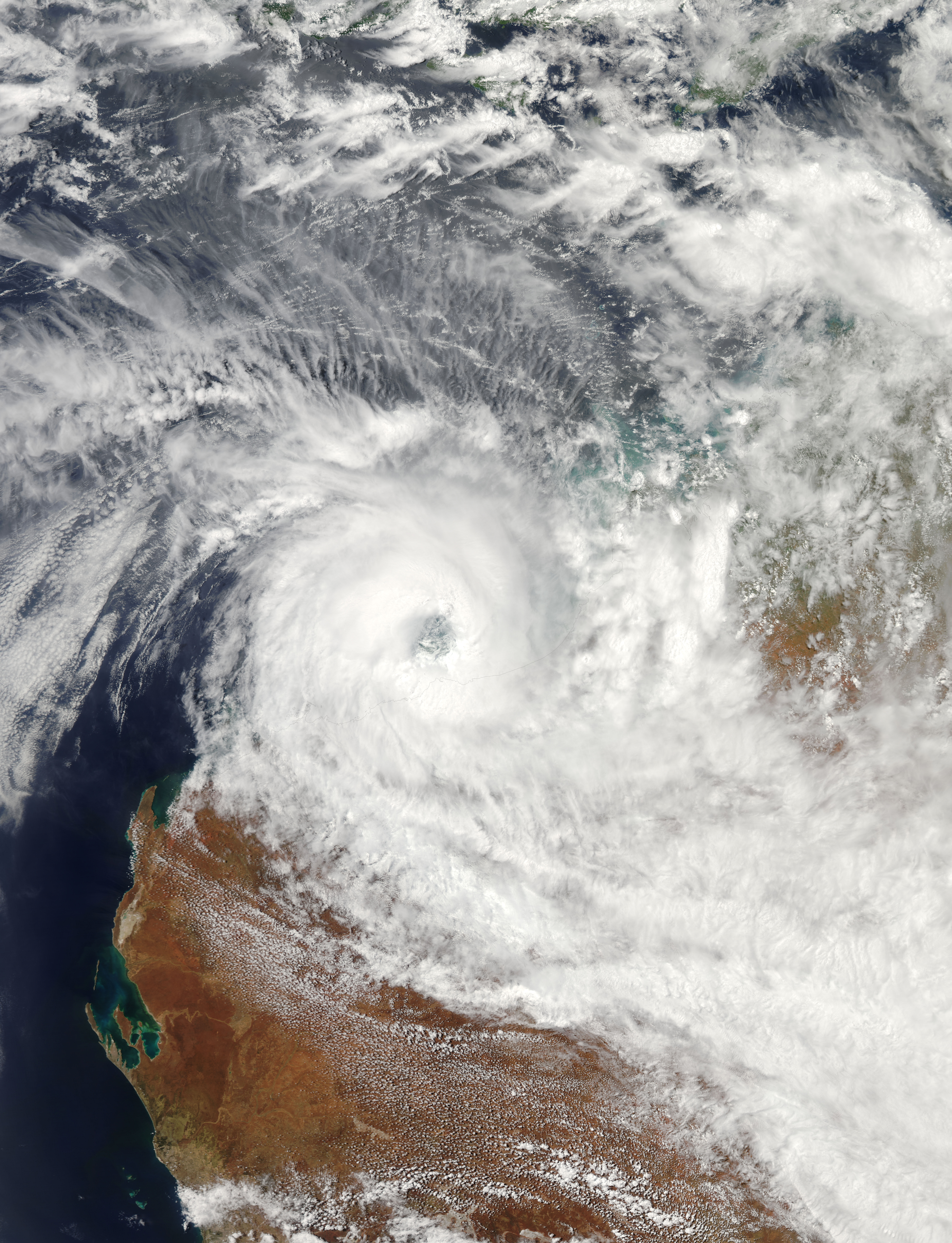
- Cyclone Rusty stalling off the coast of the Pilbara on 26 February

Meteorological history
- Formed: 22 February 2013
- Remnant low: 28 February 2013
- Dissipated: 5 March 2013

Category 4 severe tropical cyclone
- 10-minute sustained (BOM)
- Highest winds: 165 km/h (105 mph)
- Highest gusts: 230 km/h (145 mph)
- Lowest pressure: 944 hPa (mbar); 27.88 inHg

Category 3-equivalent tropical cyclone
- 1-minute sustained (SSHWS/JTWC)
- Highest winds: 185 km/h (115 mph)
- Lowest pressure: 948 hPa (mbar); 27.99 inHg

Overall effects
- Fatalities: None reported
- Damage: $510 million (2013 USD)
- Areas affected: Western Australia, South Australia
- IBTrACS
- Part of the 2012–13 Australian region cyclone season

Severe Tropical Cyclone Rusty was a strong, slow-moving tropical cyclone that produced record duration gale-force winds in Port Hedland, Western Australia in late February 2013. Originating as an area of low pressure on 22 February well to the northwest of the Kimberley region of Western Australia, the precursor to Rusty steadily developed within a favourable environment. Gradually decreasing surface pressures in the region signaled intensification and the low was classified as Tropical Cyclone Rusty on 23 February. Although a large, sprawling system, near-record high sea surface temperatures enabled Rusty to quickly deepen. Becoming essentially stationary on 25 February, the system acquired hurricane-force winds as its core improved in structure. The cyclone achieved its peak intensity two days later with maximum ten-minute sustained winds of 165 km/h (105 mph) and a barometric pressure of 944 hPa (mbar; 27.88 inHg). Thereafter, interaction with land caused its core to collapse before the system made landfall near Pardoo Station. Rusty weakened below cyclone strength on 28 February. Its remnants persisted over Western Australia for several more days before being absorbed into an extratropical cyclone on 5 March.

Owing to the slow-moving nature of Rusty, a large swath of coastal Western Australia saw heavy rains from the storm with a storm peak of 374 mm (14.7 in) at De Grey Station. Substantial flooding took place accordingly; the De Grey River crested just shy of its all-time record at 17.23 m (56.5 ft). Some structural damage took place, but the predominant effects of the storm were sustained by agriculture and infrastructure. Economic losses related to the storm exceeds A$500 million (US$510 million). The name Rusty was later retired, replaced with Riordan in 2016.

== Meteorological history ==
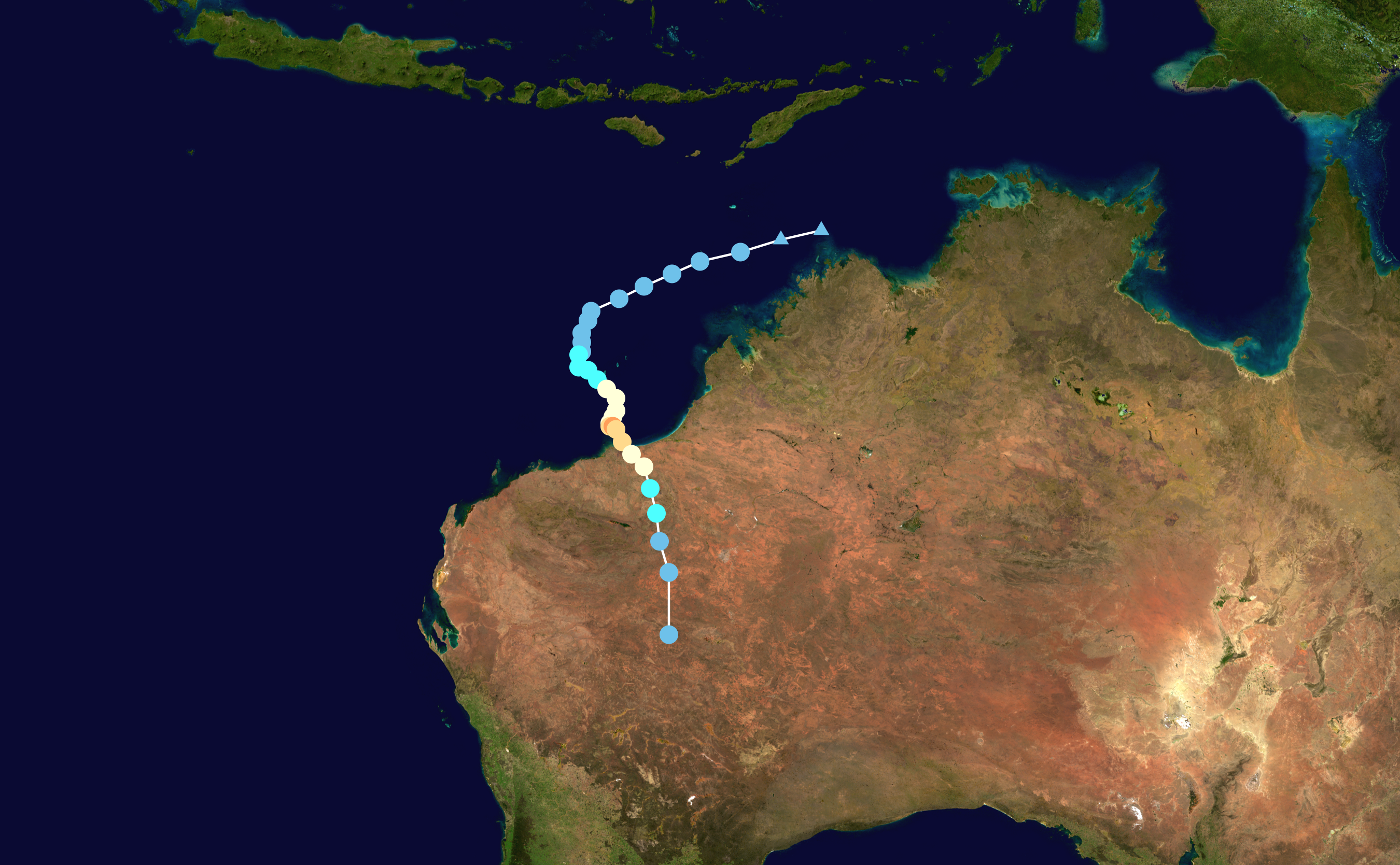
Map plotting the storm's track and intensity, according to the Saffir–Simpson scale Map key Saffir–Simpson scale Tropical depression (≤38 mph, ≤62 km/h) Tropical storm (39–73 mph, 63–118 km/h) Category 1 (74–95 mph, 119–153 km/h) Category 2 (96–110 mph, 154–177 km/h) Category 3 (111–129 mph, 178–208 km/h) Category 4 (130–156 mph, 209–251 km/h) Category 5 (≥157 mph, ≥252 km/h) Unknown Storm type Tropical cyclone Subtropical cyclone Extratropical cyclone, remnant low, tropical disturbance, or monsoon depression

In late February 2013, a monsoon trough combined with the Madden–Julian oscillation to produce an area of low pressure on 22 February well to the northeast of the Kimberley region. Upon its formation, the Bureau of Meteorology (BoM) began monitoring the system as Tropical Low 10U. Low to moderate upper-level wind shear and favorable diffluence supported tropical cyclogenesis as the system moved slowly south along the edge of a subtropical ridge. By 23 February, deep convective banding features were wrapping into a well-defined circulation. This prompted the Joint Typhoon Warning Center (JTWC) to issue a Tropical Cyclone Formation Alert at 0300 UTC and subsequently initiate advisories on the storm as Tropical Cyclone 17S at 0000 UTC on 24 February. Surface pressures around the cyclone had significantly decreased by this time, with an automated weather station on Rowley Shoals, roughly 130 km (81 mi) southeast of the storm's centre, recording a 7 mbar (hPa; 0.21 inHg) drop to 993 hPa (mbar; 29.33 inHg) in 24 hours. The BoM similarly classified the system as a tropical cyclone hours later as gale-force winds were observed on Bedout Island. They consequently assigned it the name Rusty, at which time the cyclone was situated roughly 360 km (220 mi) north of Port Hedland, Western Australia.

A large monsoonal cyclone, Rusty featured an expansive cloud mass with a relatively cloud-free centre spanning 160 km (99 mi). Under normal circumstances, cyclones of this nature tend to develop slowly due to their sprawling nature; however, near-record high sea surface temperatures of 31 to 32 °C (88 to 90 °F) fueled an unusually quick organization. The high temperatures were linked to a record warm January across the entirety of Australia. Additionally the warmth extended to a great depth, resulting in a high tropical cyclone heat potential of 90 kJ/cm^{2}. Throughout 24 February, convective bands steadily consolidated around the circulation as it intensified. The strongest winds continued to be displaced well to the south of the centre, however, within the most persistent convective band. This large, intense band extended westward from Broome to Port Hedland and into the western portion of Rusty's circulation. Areas within this band experienced gale-force winds despite being more than 200 km (120 mi) away from the cyclone. Increasingly rapid strengthening took place later in the day with a 35 km (22 mi) wide eye developing. Rusty became virtually stationary late on 25 February as a trough to its south weakened the ridge previously steering the cyclone south.

Throughout 25 February, the storm's eye expanded to an asymmetrical 95 by 185 km (59 by 115 mi) diameter. By 1200 UTC, Rusty had intensified into a severe tropical cyclone — a Category 3 or higher on the Australian cyclone intensity scale; this was supported by measurements of sustained 125 km/h (78 mph) at Rowley Shoals. (Note: A severe tropical cyclone indicates a storm that has ten-minute sustained winds in excess of 120 km/h (75 mph).) The large circulation began contracting later that day and into 26 February. Intensification resumed later that day and into 27 February. Favorable outflow, enhanced by a mid-latitude trough to the south, allowed for deep convection to form around the eyewall. Rusty attained its peak strength early on 27 February with sustained winds of 165 km/h (105 mph), with gusts up to 230 km/h (145 mph), and an estimated central pressure of 944 hPa (mbar; 27.91 inHg). The JTWC estimated one-minute sustained winds at this time to have been 185 km/h (115 mph), equivalent to a Category 3 hurricane on the Saffir–Simpson hurricane wind scale. Shortly thereafter, the ridge over Australia began to rebuild and prompted Rusty to drift south-southeast. Interaction with the Australian mainland incited weakening of the cyclone. As it approached the Pilbara coastline, the eastern eyewall collapsed and its eye became increasingly cloud-filled. Bedout Island, which took a direct hit from the eyewall, only recorded 98 km/h (61 mph) sustained winds with gusts to 119 km/h (74 mph).

Around 0900 UTC on 27 February Rusty made landfall near Pardoo Station, roughly 110 km (68 mi) east of Port Hedland, with winds of 130 km/h (80 mph). Once onshore, steady weakening ensued. Within six hours, the eye dissipated and deep convection diminished, becoming more confined to the southern side of the circulation. A combination of increasing shear and land interaction ultimately caused the storm to weaken below cyclone strength early on 28 February, at which time it was situated roughly 70 km (43 mi) southeast of Nullagine. The remnants continued southward over Western Australia, eventually opening up into a trough on 3 March. The system subsequently moved back over water that day before being absorbed by an approaching extratropical cyclone by 5 March.

== Preparations ==
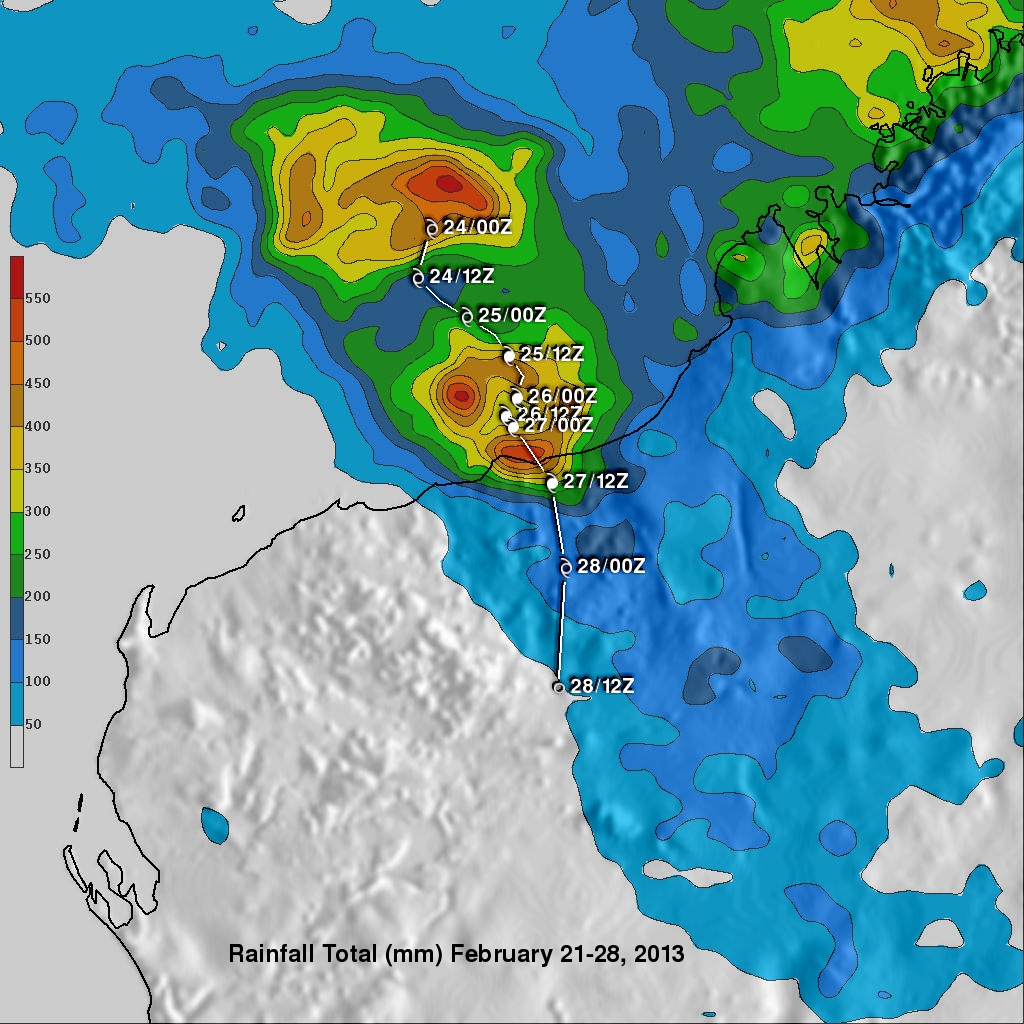
Satellite rainfall analysis from 21 to 28 February showing accumulations throughout Rusty's path. A storm maxima of approximately 600 mm (23.6 in) occurred offshore while onshore totals peaked at 500 mm (19.7 in) near Port Hedland.

The Port of Port Hedland was shut down for 86 hours as the cyclone slowly moved by, causing significant disruptions to shipping. Twenty-six ships were evacuated from the port prior to the storm's arrival. Onshore mining was suspended for similar durations nearby. BHP, Rio Tinto and Fortescue temporarily shut down or scaled back all operations in the area. The prolonged closure of the port resulted in a 2.4% drop in iron ore prices. Losses from lack of productivity and revenue associated with the port closures exceeds A$500 million (US$510 million).

Coastal areas of Pilbara were placed on red alert on 26 February, meaning residents were on full lock down until the cyclone's passage. Approximately 500 people sought refuge in public shelters during the storm. As a preventative measure, a 60 km (37 mi) stretch of the Great Northern Highway between Port Hedland and Sandfire was shut down for several days. The road closures caused food and gas shortages in some areas; however, police eventually let trucks with supplies through the closed roads. As the remnants of Rusty moved south, flood warnings were raised across the Goldfields-Esperance region by 2 March and flood-prone roads were shut down. A local race was cancelled due to the storm in Esperance.

== Impact and aftermath ==
Owing to the slow movement of Rusty, many areas along coastal Pilbara experienced prolonged periods of gale-force winds and heavy rain. Sustained gales affected Port Hedland for a record-breaking 39 hours straight. Gusts reached 124 km/h (77 mph) on Bedout Island before the anemometer failed. Port Hedland International Airport recorded gusts up to 119 km/h (74 mph). A large swath of Western Australia experienced heavy rains from the cyclone, with accumulations of at least 200 mm (7.9 in) stretching from northwestern areas of Kimberley to central areas of the state. A storm maxima rainfall of 374 mm (14.7 in) was measured at De Grey Station; however, an unofficial report of 428.5 mm (16.87 in) was received from Pardoo Station. Another report from Pardoo stated that the area received 520 mm (20 in) of rain in three days. Over five days, 276 mm (10.9 in) fell at the Anna Plains Station, accounting for 65% of its seasonal rainfall. Many farmers in Western Australia considered the rain to be beneficial as it caused little damage outside Pardoo. Farther south in the Goldfields-Esperance region, accumulations peaked at 117 mm (4.6 in) in Lorna Glen. Kalgoorlie experienced its wettest March day ever, with a 24‑hour total of 88.2 mm (3.47 in); it was also on track to be the fourth wettest March on record in just two days.

Major flooding took place along the De Grey River as it rose to 17.23 m (56.5 ft), just short of the all-time record of 17.76 m (58.3 ft) set in 2000. Discharge also reached a tremendous 7,843 m^{3}/s (276,973 ft^{3}/2). Between 26 February and 2 March, an estimated 1.4 million megalitres (370 billion gallons) of water flowed the river. The effects of flooding from the river were mainly confined to Pardoo Station, where significant cattle loss took place. Many of the station's buildings were flooded and roughly 300 km (190 mi) of roads were washed away. The Nullagine, Oakover, and Coongan rivers rose above flood levels. Only minor damage took place in Port Hedland while some flooding took place in Kalgoorlie and Kambalda, with some homes damaged. Downed tree limbs and power lines in Port Hedland left 55 homes without power. Along the beach, a dolphin was washed ashore during the storm. It was brought to a tidal pool by Department of Environment and Conservation officers and cared for five hours before being released back into the ocean.

The storm also weakened the seasonal monsoon trough over southern areas of the country in early March, triggering an intense heat wave across the region. Areas recently affected by the cyclone in Pilbara experienced temperatures up to 45 °C (113 °F), the highest temperatures in six years. Melbourne, Victoria, saw a record nine days of high temperatures above 30 °C (86 °F) as the air mass moved east. Records in the city began in 1856. The city subsequently broke its record for continuous days with minimum temperatures of at least 20 °C (68 °F), reaching seven on 13 March. The Australian Energy Market Operator reported record electrical demands across the state of Victoria, with usage reaching more than 9,500 MW on 12 March. Owing to the prolonged heat, incidents requiring paramedics increased by 25 percent from the previous week.

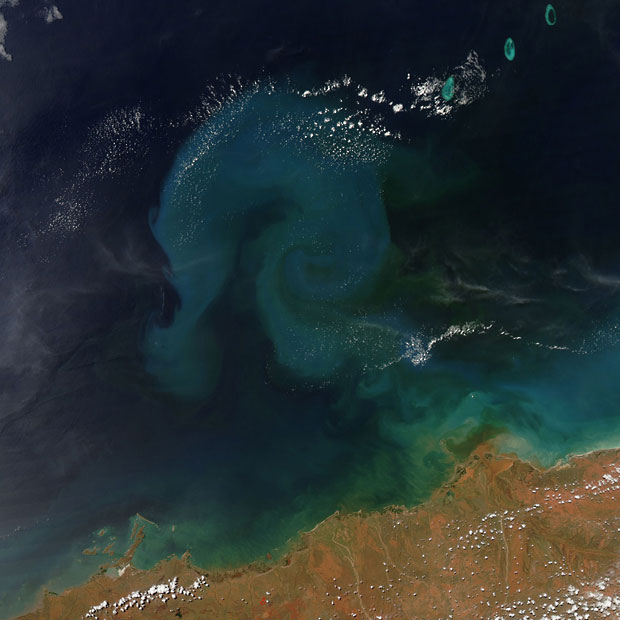
A large algal bloom off the coast of Pilbara in March following Cyclone Rusty. Sediment run-off from heavy rains can also be seen along the coast.

Immediately following Rusty's landfall, the Department of Fire and Emergency Services placed 30 personnel on standby and began aerial surveys to determine if residents needed aid. Residents in Pilbara were warned of the dangers of asbestos in damaged or destroyed structures in early March as they were allowed to return home. A week after Rusty passed through Pilbara, an algal bloom the size of Tasmania appeared offshore. Unprecedented turbidity from the storm stirred up a large column of nutrients from the seafloor and brought it to the surface, causing the rapid increase in algae. Despite its size, it was not expected to have any lasting effects in the region.

Later in 2013, Rusty was retired from the list names in the Australian Basin. During November 2014 the name Rubina was chosen to replace Rusty. However, Rubina was later withdrawn and replaced by Riordan in an update to the names in October 2016.

== See also ==
- 2012–13 Australian region cyclone season
- Cyclone Lua – A storm of similar intensity that struck the same regions a year prior
- Cyclone Christine – A storm of similar intensity that struck the same regions at the very end of the year
- Cyclones Kelvin (2018) and Ilsa (2023) - the next two systems to make landfall between Port Hedland and Broome as severe tropical cyclones.
