= List of Western Australia tropical cyclones =

Australian tropical cyclone intensity scale
Category	Sustained winds	Gusts
Five	>107 kn (198 km/h; 123 mph)	>151 kn (280 km/h; 174 mph)
Four	86–107 kn (159–198 km/h; 99–123 mph)	122–151 kn (226–280 km/h; 140–174 mph)
Three	64–85 kn (119–157 km/h; 74–98 mph)	90–121 kn (167–224 km/h; 104–139 mph)
Two	48–63 kn (89–117 km/h; 55–72 mph)	68–89 kn (126–165 km/h; 78–102 mph)
One	34–47 kn (63–87 km/h; 39–54 mph)	49–67 kn (91–124 km/h; 56–77 mph)

This is a list of cyclones that have significantly affected or made landfall over the coast of Western Australia.

Name	Year	Date of landfall	Peak intensity (Note: If multiple landfalls took place along the storm's track, the highest intensity is listed.) (Note: Listings in italics denote storms that did not make landfall but had impact on land.)		Deaths	Damage (A$)	Remarks
Name	Year	Date of landfall	Winds	Pressure	Deaths	Damage (A$)	Remarks
—N/a	1870	24 December	—N/a	956 hPa (28.23 inHg)	0	Unknown	A severe storm caused extensive defoliation and debarking of trees in Roebourne.
—N/a	1875	24 December	—N/a	—N/a	69	Unknown	Cyclone hovered in Exmouth Gulf for nearly two weeks; 69 lives lost, mostly on ships at sea in the area.
—N/a	1881	6 January	—N/a	—N/a	16	Unknown	Many schooners sank or were washed ashore by a cyclone that struck Roebourne. A large storm surge caused dramatic changes to coastal landscapes as well.
—N/a	1881	7 March	—N/a	942 hPa (27.82 inHg)	0	Unknown	A severe storm struck Roebourne and Cossack, damaging nearly every structure.
—N/a	1884	1 April	—N/a	—N/a	140	Unknown	Forty vessels of a pearling fleet sunk with 140 lives lost in Lagrange Bay
—N/a	1889	1 March	—N/a	—N/a	1	Unknown	A cyclone struck Cossack at high tide, causing considerable flooding.
—N/a	1894	4–9 January	—N/a	—N/a	40	Unknown	Two consecutive cyclones struck the Pilbara coastline and caused extensive damage in Roebourne and Cossack. The second storm destroyed the seawall in Cossack. All fatalities took place offshore due to the sinking of twelve luggers and the steamer Anne. Damage was estimated at £15,000.
—N/a	1898	2 April	—N/a	—N/a	0	Unknown	Severe damage, described as the worst ever seen, took place in Cossack. Infrastructure was devastated and losses reached £30,000. A record-breaking 747 mm (29.4 in) of rain was measured in 24 hours at Whim Creek.
—N/a	1903	8 January	—N/a	—N/a	0	Unknown	Storm dropped 637 mm (25.1 in) of rain in Wyndham over a five-day span causing unprecedented flooding and severe stock losses.
—N/a	1908	12 January	—N/a	—N/a	50	Unknown	Struck Broome; most deaths at sea
—N/a	1910	19 November	175 km/h (110 mph) (Note: Estimated maximum wind gusts.)	965 hPa (28.50 inHg)	40	Unknown	Storm caused severe damage in and around Broome. Twenty homes were destroyed while seventy more were damaged, with losses amounting to £20,000. Offsore, 67 pearling vessels were blown ashore while 34 more sank.
—N/a	1912	21 March	102 km/h (63 mph)	N/A	150	Unknown	The coal steamer Koombana sank after sailing into the eye of this storm with all hands lost. The storm made landfall near Balla Balla and caused severe damage.
—N/a	1914	9 January	<65 km/h (<40 mph)	N/A	0	Unknown	Tropical low caused record-breaking floods along the Fitzroy and Lennard rivers; many cattle were swept away.
—N/a	1925	11 January	102 km/h (63 mph)	N/A	0	Unknown	Severe flooding took place along the Cossack River and every building was damaged in Roebourne.
—N/a	1925	26 February	—N/a	—N/a	0	Unknown	All homes in Marble Bar were damaged and some were destroyed. Extensive damage also took place in Nullagine.
—N/a	1926	22 January	160 km/h (100 mph)	982 hPa (29.00 inHg)	40	Unknown	Extensive damage took place in Broome.
—N/a	1930	28 December	—N/a	—N/a	0	Unknown	Considerable damage in and around Marble Bar and Nullagine.
—N/a	1935	26 March	130 km/h (80 mph)	995 hPa (29.38 inHg)	141	Unknown	Storm caused severe damage in Derby. A pearling fleet near the Lacepede Islands was devastated by the storm, resulting in 141 fatalities.
—N/a	1939	11 January	200 km/h (125 mph)	N/A	9	Unknown	A storm surge of 9.8 m (32 ft) caused extensive damage in Port Hedland and left 30 percent of the town homeless. The Nicol Bay sank along the Ashburton River and some damage took place in Roebourne.
—N/a	1941	1 March	—N/a	—N/a	0	Unknown	Homes flattened in Comet Mine and heavy rain caused significant flooding.
—N/a	1942	11 January	230 km/h (145 mph)	938 hPa; (27.70 inHg)	2	Unknown	All homes in Port Hedland sustained some degree of damage.
—N/a	1956	18–26 February	—N/a	—N/a	0	Unknown	The Fitzroy River exceeded flood levels set during the 1914 flood, with the river spanning 24 km (15 mi) across in some areas. The town of Derby was entirely cut off from surrounding areas.
—N/a	1957	14 February	161 km/h (101 mph)	964 hPa (28.47 inHg)	2	Unknown	Many homes sustained significant damage; losses reached £80,000.
—N/a	1959	April	—N/a	—N/a	0	Unknown	Cyclone dropped 440 mm (17 in) of rain over two days in Wyndham, causing flooding.
Alby	1978	4 April	200 km/h (125 mph)	930 hPa (27.46 inHg)	5	$39 million	Caused the most widespread cyclone damage in Western Australia's history. Destroyed a large portion of the Busselton Jetty. Affected Perth with the 3rd highest recorded wind gust in the city's history, 130 km/h (81 mph), and Fremantle with a 143 km/h (89 mph) gust. Fueled bushfires which killed 2 more people indirectly.
Jane	1983	9 January	170 km/h (105 mph)	947 hPa (27.96 inHg)	0	Minor	Made landfall east of Port Hedland causing moderate damage, particularly in Pardoo Station.
Lena	1983	8 April	110 km/h (70 mph)	980 hPa (28.94 inHg)	0	Minor	Lena passed directly over Port Hedland as a category two. Moderate damage was reported; one poorly built house and several fishing boats were destroyed.
Quenton	1983	30 November	170 km/h (105 mph)	955 hPa (28.20 inHg)	0	Minor	The earliest recorded landfalling severe tropical cyclone in Western Australia. Caused minor damage at the Sandfire Roadhouse.
Chloe	1984	29 February	170 km/h (105 mph)	955 hPa (28.20 inHg)	0	Unknown (severe)	Made landfall as a category four, severe structural damage occurred in Roebourne with some houses completely destroyed. Severe wind damage was also reported at Dampier, Whim Creek and Port Hedland while a flash flood damaged much of Wickham.
Frank	1984	27 December	175 km/h (110 mph)	952 hPa (28.11 inHg)	0	Minor	Frank made landfall over Port Hedland causing minor wind damage.
Connie	1987	19 January	155 km/h (95 mph)	950 hPa (28.05 inHg)	0	Minor	Connie passed over Port Hedland on 19 January, causing moderate infrastructure damage. The roof of the historic Whim Creek Pub was also torn off in the storm.
Elsie	1987	25 February	175 km/h (110 mph)	940 hPa (27.76 inHg)	0	Unknown (severe)	Elise passed directly over Mandora Station as a category four resulting in catastrophic damage. Almost all of the stations buildings were destroyed, including the main homestead. Mandora was completely rebuilt with buildings constructed to withstand severe tropical cyclone winds.
Herbie	1988	21 May	75 km/h (45 mph)	980 hPa (28.94 inHg)	0	$20 million	Herbie made landfall over Denham as a category one storm. Severe damage was reported in the town, with some roofs torn off and fences blown over. Flash-flooding was reported from Carnarvon to Geraldton. The storm crossed the coast on 21 May, the latest known date of landfall for a tropical cyclone in Australia. Responsible for the sinking, & hence rapid breaking-up, of the MV Korean Star (1984) near Cape Cuvier on 20 May.
Ned	1989	1 April	165 km/h (105 mph)	941 hPa (27.79 inHg)	0	Unknown	Ned crossed the coast just south of Perth as a category one on 1 April. Moderate wind damage was reported in Rockingham. Ned is the most southerly landfalling tropical cyclone recorded in Australia and the only storm ever to directly affect Perth city at cyclone strength.
Orson	1989	23 April	250 km/h (155 mph)	925 hPa (27.32 inHg)	5	$25 million	Orson made landfall near Dampier as a strong category five however damage was minimal due to the storms fast speed and small wind field. Severe damage was however reported on an offshore drilling rig and five people drowned after their boat capsized in rough seas. Before landfall, Orson was the fourth most intense cyclone ever recorded in Australian waters.
Ian	1992	3 March	210 km/h (130 mph)	930 hPa (27.46 inHg)	0	Minor	Ian made landfall near Mardie Station as a category three. Minor damage occurred to mining operations in the Montebello Islands and on Barrow Island.
—N/a	1993	February	<65 km/h (<40 mph)	N/A	0	Unknown	Twin tropical lows brought rainfall in excess of 500 mm (20 in) to the Kimberley region, causing severe flooding. Extensive damage to infrastructure occurred.
Annette	1994	18 December	195 km/h (120 mph)	925 hPa (27.32 inHg)	0	Minor	Annette made landfall over Mandora Station as a category four causing severe damage to the homestead and surrounding area and killing several hundred cattle.
Bobby	1995	25 February	195 km/h (120 mph)	925 hPa (27.32 inHg)	8	Unknown	Bobby crossed the coast as a category three near Onslow on 25 February causing severe flooding across the north-west. Eight people were killed in total, seven who were in a boat that capsized off the coast of Onslow and an eighth person drowned in floodwaters near Carnarvon.
Chloe	1995	7 April	200 km/h (125 mph)	920 hPa (27.17 inHg)	0	None	Crossed the coast east of Derby as a severe tropical cyclone in early April 1995.
Frank	1995	13 December	130 km/h (80 mph)	965 hPa (28.50 inHg)	0	Minor	Frank crossed the coast near Carnarvon as a tropical low causing minor property damage at Exmouth.
Gertie	1995	20 December	130 km/h (80 mph)	965 hPa (28.50 inHg)	0	Minor	Crossed the coast near Mandora Station causing only minor damage.
Kirsty	1996	12 March	175 km/h (110 mph)	935 hPa (27.61 inHg)	0	Unknown	Made landfall as a severe cyclone near Port Hedland. Many structures were damaged in that town while severe damage was reported at nearby Pardoo Station, with some buildings completely demolished.
Olivia	1996	10 April	195 km/h (120 mph)	925 hPa (27.32 inHg)	0	Unknown	Olivia crossed the coast near Pannawonica causing moderate damage to structures in that town. Before making landfall, a world record wind gust of 408 km/h (253 mph) was recorded on Barrow Island.
Phil	1996	28 December	110 km/h (70 mph)	975 hPa (28.79 inHg)	0	None	Phil crossed the coast in the Joseph Bonaparte Gulf as a weak cyclone.
Rachel	1997	8 December	130 km/h (80 mph)	965 hPa (28.50 inHg)	0	Unknown	Rachel made landfall near Port Hedland on 7 January 1997.
Tiffany	1998	25 December	170 km/h (105 mph)	940 hPa (27.76 inHg)	0	None	Tiffany brushed the Pilbara coastline, causing heavy rain and some flooding from Broome to Karratha.
Billy	1998	6 December	130 km/h (80 mph)	965 hPa (28.50 inHg)	0	None	Billy made landfall near Onslow and caused minor flooding.
Thelma	1998	11 December	220 km/h (135 mph)	920 hPa (27.17 inHg)	1	Unknown	Thelma made landfall near Kuri Bay as a category three cyclone after weakening from a strong category five, causing flooding throughout the Kimberley. One man drowned in floodwaters near Kalumburu.
Vance	1999	22 March	215 km/h (135 mph)	910 hPa (26.87 inHg)	0	$100 million	Cyclone Vance made landfall over Exmouth as a strong category five, one of the strongest landfalling cyclones recorded in Australia. Exmouth was devastated, with the whole town badly damaged and many houses destroyed. It was also the costliest cyclone on record to hit Western Australia with damage totaling over $100 million Aud.
Elaine	1999	20 March	165 km/h (105 mph)	945 hPa (27.91 inHg)	0	Minor	Elaine made landfall near Kalbarri as a category one causing torrential rain and flash flooding in the northern Wheatbelt region. The town of Moora was most badly affected, with the majority of the town flooded.
Gwenda	1999	7 April	225 km/h (140 mph)	900 hPa (26.58 inHg)	0	Minor	Gwenda made landfall as a category two near Port Hedland. Damage was only minor and significantly less than expected. Before making landfall, Gwenda was one of the strongest cyclones ever recorded in the Australian region.
John	1999	15 December	205 km/h (125 mph)	915 hPa (27.02 inHg)	0	Unknown	John made landfall as a category five near Whim Creek, causing severe damage in that town but most surrounding areas were relatively unscathed.
Ilsa	1999	17 December	100 km/h (60 mph)	980 hPa (28.94 inHg)	0	None	Made landfall as a weak cyclone near the Sandfire Roadhouse causing heavy rain.
Steve	2000	6 & 9 March	150 km/h (95 mph)	975 hPa (28.79 inHg)	0	$100 million	Steve made two landfalls in Western Australia, once near Karratha and again near Carnarvon. Damage was severe from flooding in Gascoyne River and flooding rains extended as far south as Esperance.
Rosita	2000	20 April	185 km/h (115 mph)	930 hPa (27.46 inHg)	0	Unknown (severe)	Rosita made landfall 40 km (25 mi) south of Broome as a category five. Vegetation damage was extreme with almost all trees destroyed within the landfall area. Yardoogarra station and a nearby tourist resort were completely flattened with many buildings torn from their foundations. Fortunately, there were no deaths apart from 200 cattle.
Sam	2000	8 December	175 km/h (110 mph)	950 hPa (28.05 inHg)	0	Unknown (severe)	Sam made landfall as a category four west of Broome, causing severe damage to a few isolated cattle stations and indigenous communities. Almost all buildings on the Anna Plains Station were flattened and the town of Bidyadanga was also severely damaged. Both locations had been evacuated beforehand so there were no deaths as a result of the storm.
Terri	2001	31 January	110 km/h (70 mph)	975 hPa (28.79 inHg)	0	None	Made landfall near Pardoo Station as a weak cyclone causing no damage.
Vincent	2001	14 February	100 km/h (60 mph)	981 hPa (28.97 inHg)	0	None	Made landfall west of Broome causing no damage.
Alistair	2001	19 April	110 km/h (70 mph)	975 hPa (28.79 inHg)	0	Unknown	Brushed the Kimberley coast as a category one and then made landfall near Carnarvon as a tropical low causing significant damage to fruit plantations.
Chris	2002	5 February	205 km/h (125 mph)	915 hPa (27.02 inHg)	0	$1 million	Chris crossed the coast in a remote area roughly halfway between Broome and Port Hedland as a category five. Structural damage was minor, however many thousands of cattle were killed, amounting to $1 million in damages.
N/A	2003	25 January	095 km/h (60 mph)	988 hPa (29.18 inHg)	0	Minor	Made landfall near Port Hedland causing heavy rain and minor flooding.
Graham	2003	28 February	095 km/h (60 mph)	985 hPa (29.09 inHg)	1	Minor	Graham made landfall as a slow moving, weak cyclone, therefore causing negligible wind damage but widespread flooding. One person was swept away by floodwaters and killed near Fitzroy Crossing.
Inigo	2003	8 April	240 km/h (150 mph)	900 hPa (26.58 inHg)	0	Minor	Cyclone Inigo was the most intense cyclone recorded off the coast of Western Australia however had weakened significantly to a category one at landfall and caused little to no damage, apart from localized flash flooding.
Monty	2004	1 March	185 km/h (115 mph)	935 hPa (27.61 inHg)	0	Minor	Made landfall west of Karratha as a category 3. Major flooding was observed with 24‑hour rainfall totals of up to 400 mm (15.74 in), and several people were stranded by floodwaters and had to be rescued near Pannawonica.
Fay	2004	27 March	215 km/h (135 mph)	910 hPa (26.87 inHg)	0	Minor	Cyclone Fay made landfall as a category four on a remote section of the Pilbara coast, therefore causing little damage.
Raymond	2005	2 January	85 km/h (55 mph)	985 hPa (29.09 inHg)	0	None	Made landfall near Kalumburu causing no damage.
Ingrid	2005	15 March	230 km/h (145 mph)	924 hPa (27.29 inHg)	0	Unknown	Made landfall near Kalumburu as a category five. Structural damage was minor, however environmental damage was severe with hundreds of kilometers of forest destroyed.
Clare	2006	9 January	140 km/h (85 mph)	960 hPa (28.35 inHg)	0	$2.4 million	Made landfall near Karratha causing extremely heavy rain and widespread flooding.
Emma	2006	28 February	75 km/h (45 mph)	988 hPa (29.18 inHg)	0	$1 million	A large and slow moving storm caused heavy rain and flooding across almost the entire length of Western Australia.
Glenda	2006	30 March	205 km/h (125 mph)	910 hPa (26.87 inHg)	0	$1.2 million	Made landfall over Onslow as a category three storm causing moderate damage (severe economic damage however). 206 mm (8.11 in) of rain was recorded in 24 hours, causing flash flooding.
Hubert	2006	7 April	95 km/h (60 mph)	980 hPa (28.94 inHg)	0	None	Crossed the coast near Onslow as a weak category one.
Isobel	2007	3 January	85 km/h (55 mph)	982 hPa (29.00 inHg)	0	None	Crossed the coast near Broome.
George	2007	8 March	205 km/h (125 mph)	902 hPa (26.64 inHg)	3	$8 million	George made landfall just east of Port Hedland as a category five causing severe destruction. Many houses were flattened, mining camps were completely demolished and the town was labeled a disaster zone. Overall three people were killed and damage totaled $8 million. George was one of the most intense cyclones on record to strike the Pilbara region.
Jacob	2007	12 March	130 km/h (80 mph)	960 hPa (28.35 inHg)	0	Minor	Made landfall as a tropical low near Port Hedland, causing minor flooding.
Helen	2008	1 January	95 km/h (60 mph)	975 hPa (28.79 inHg)	0	None	Brushed the coastline of the Joseph Bonaparte Gulf.
Nicholas	2008	20 February	150 km/h (95 mph)	948 hPa (27.99 inHg)	0	Minor	Category three cyclone caused heavy rain but little damage in the Carnarvon district.
Billy	2008	20 December	175 km/h (110 mph)	950 hPa (28.05 inHg)	0	Minor	Made landfall as a category two near Wyndham, causing minor flooding. Further intensified to a category four after moving out to sea.
Dominic	2009	27 January	100 km/h (60 mph)	976 hPa (28.82 inHg)	1	Minor	Dominic made landfall as a category two near Onslow, causing minor wind and flooding damage. A crane worker was killed due to high winds in Port Hedland.
Laurence	2009	16 & 21 December	205 km/h (125 mph)	925 hPa (27.32 inHg)	0	$9 million	Laurence made landfall twice, once near Cockatoo Island and again at Eighty Mile Beach. Wind damage was severe and some houses were demolished, however it was not widespread due to the isolated areas where the storm made landfall.
Magda	2010	21 January	130 km/h (80 mph)	975 hPa (28.79 inHg)	0	Minor	Made landfall near Kuri Bay in the Kimberley as a category three with only minor damage.
03U	2010	18 December	55 km/h (35 mph)	989 hPa (29.21 inHg)	0	$100 million	A weak tropical low, however caused extreme flooding and severe damage in the Gascoyne River region of Western Australia.
Bianca	2011	25 January	175 km/h (110 mph)	949 hPa (28.02 inHg)	2	Minor	Was expected to make landfall however moved parallel to the Pilbara coastline and caused little damage.
Carlos	2011	19 February	120 km/h (75 mph)	969 hPa (28.61 inHg)	0	$16 million	Carlos brushed the Pilbara coast causing heavy rainfall and high winds from Broome all the way to Exmouth. Building damage was severe in Karratha.
Heidi	2012	12 January	150 km/h (95 mph)	960 hPa (28.35 inHg)	0	None	Heidi made landfall near Port Hedland with minor impacts.
Iggy	2012	2 February	110 km/h (70 mph)	974 hPa (28.76 inHg)	0	None	Iggy made landfall as a tropical low near Jurien Bay causing heavy rainfall and some flooding.
Lua	2012	17 March	165 km/h (105 mph)	930 hPa (27.46 inHg)	0	$230 million	Cyclone Lua caused severe damage across isolated cattle stations in the Pilbara as a category four.
Peta	2013	23 January	65 km/h (40 mph)	992 hPa (29.29 inHg)	0	None	Cyclone Peta was a weak cyclone that made landfall near Port Hedland with limited effects.
Rusty	2013	27 February	165 km/h (105 mph)	945 hPa (27.91 inHg)	0	$478 million	Made landfall as a category four at Pardoo Station with only minor structural damage however severe economic damage through loss of revenue of mining companies.
Alessia	2013	23 November	85 km/h (55 mph)	991 hPa (29.26 inHg)	0	None	Alessia brushed the Kimberley region with minor effects.
Christine	2013	30 December	165 km/h (105 mph)	948 hPa (27.99 inHg)	0	Unknown	Christine made landfall in the Pilbara. Caused heavy damage in the towns of Roebourne and Wickham with many roofs torn off and smaller structures destroyed.
Olwyn	2015	13 March	150 km/h (95 mph)	950 hPa (28.05 inHg)	0	None	Olwyn tracked the Western Australian coast from Exmouth, Western Australia to Shark Bay, passing directly over Carnarvon. It caused heavy damage of infrastructure & crops at Carnarvon. One person had sustained life-threatening injuries in a related car incident.
Quang	2015	1 May	185 km/h (115 mph)	950 hPa (28.05 inHg)		Minimal	Quang made landfall in Exmouth, Western Australia on the night of 1 May and brought minimal damage.
Stan	2016	29 January	110 km/h (70 mph)	975 hPa (28.79 inHg)	0	Unknown	Stan subsequently made landfall between Port Hedland and Wallal and impacted various commodities including oil, natural gas and iron ore. However, human impacts were limited due to the low permanent population in the area.
Yvette	2016	25 December	75 km/h (45 mph)	987 hPa (29.15 inHg)	0	None	
Blanche	2017	7 March	95 km/h (60 mph)	988 hPa (29.18 inHg)	0	None	
Hilda	2017	28 December	95 km/h (60 mph)	980 hPa (28.94 inHg)	0	Minor	Hilda made landfall close to Anna Plains on 28 December as a category 2 cyclone, wind and flooding damage was minor along the coast in Broome.
Joyce	2018	12 January	85 km/h (55 mph)	982 hPa (29.00 inHg)	0	Unknown	
Kelvin	2018	18 February	150 km/h (95 mph)	955 hPa (28.2 inHg)	0	$25 million	Kelvin made landfall over Eighty Mile Beach and became notorious for its brown ocean effect.
Veronica	2019	19 March	215 km/h (135 mph)	928 hPa (27.4 inHg)	0	Unknown	Veronica hovered off the Pilbara coast between Port Hedland and Karratha for 24 hours before tracking westward along the coast. It made landfall as a tropical low on the North West Cape. Towns on the Pilbara coast received some damage, Pilbara ports were shut for 4 days.
Damien	2020	8 February	145 km/h (90 mph)	962 hPa (28.41 inHg)	0	Unknown	Damien made landfall as a category 3, with the eye moving directly over Karratha. The Bureau of Meteorology's Dampier radar sustained significant damage, there was some damage to property, including Karratha Airport, and to vessels moored in the area. Heavy rainfall caused flooding initially through the Kimberley when the system was a tropical low, then through the Pilbara and eastern Gascoyne.
Mangga	2020	24 May	65 km/h (40 mph)	996 hPa (29.41 inHg)	0	Minor	An off-season system that bought minor but widespread damage to Western Australia
Seroja	2021	11 April	120 km/h (75 mph)	971 hPa (28.67 inHg)	1	$200 million	Seroja made an unusually southerly landfall as a Category 3 system south of Kalbarri, causing widespread damage in the town and in neighbouring Northampton.
Anika	2022	25 February; 2 March	95 km/h (60 mph)	978 hPa (28.88 inHg)	0	Minor	Anika made landfall twice; near Kalumburu and again near Wallal both as a Category 2 system.
Ellie	2022	22 December	75 km/h (45 mph)	990 hPa (29.23 inHg)	0	$322 million	Made landfall as a Category 1 system in the Northern Territory but meandered around the Kimberley Region for up to two weeks, causing 1-in-100 year flooding in Fitzroy Crossing.
Ilsa	2023	14 April	230 km/h (145 mph)	915 hPa (27.02 inHg)	8	$10.2 million	Ilsa made landfall at peak intensity near Pardoo Station, ten-minute sustained gusts of 219 km/h (136 mph) were recorded at Bedout Island
Sean	2025	19 January	175 km/h (110 mph)	945 hPa (27.91 inHg)	0	Minor	Did not make landfall, but caused record-breaking rainfall in the city of Karratha with 274.4 mm (10.80 in) falling in 24 hours
Zelia	2025	14 February	215 km/h (135 mph)	927 hPa (27.37 inHg)	0	$733 million	Made landfall near the mouth of the De Grey River as a Category 3 system. Caused over 500 mm of flooding east of Port Hedland, requiring a number of inland communities to evacuate.
Dianne	2025	28 March	95 km/h (60 mph)	984 hPa (29.06 inHg)	0	Minor	Minor flooding in Derby.
Errol	2025	18 April	205 km/h (125 mph)	936 hPa (27.64 inHg)	0	Unknown	Made landfall as a tropical low near Adele Island
Fina	2025	24 November	195 km/h (120 mph)	938 hPa (27.70 inHg)	0	Unknown	Made landfall near the mouth of the Berkeley River as a Category 3 storm.
Hayley	2025	30 December	165 km/h (105 mph)	952 hPa (28.11 inHg)	0	Minor	Made landfall near Lombadina at Category 3, causing minor damage on the Dampier Peninsula
Luana	2026	24 January	95 km/h (60 mph)	986 hPa (29.12 inHg)	0	Unknown	Made landfall near Lombadina at Category 2, causing minor damage on the Dampier Peninsula in similar locations as Hayley
Mitchell	2026	9 February	140 km/h (85 mph)	965 hPa (28.50 inHg)	0	Unknown	Moved parallel to the Pilbara and Gascoyne Coasts and made landfall near Carnarvon as a Category 1 cyclone causing significant crop losses.
Narelle	2026	23 March; 27 March	215 km/h (135 mph)	931 hPa (27.49 inHg)	0	$500 million	Made landfall twice as a low in the Kimberley and again as a Category 3 system near Coral Bay after moving parallel to the Pilbara and Gascoyne Coasts. Exmouth copped significant damage from wind and flooding and additional crop losses were reported in Carnarvon.

== See also ==
- Outline of tropical cyclones
- List of Australia tropical cyclones

- List of Queensland tropical cyclones
