= Acacia fecunda =

Mosquito Creek wattle

Scientific classification
- Kingdom: Plantae
- Clade: Tracheophytes
- Clade: Angiosperms
- Clade: Eudicots
- Clade: Rosids
- Order: Fabales
- Family: Fabaceae
- Subfamily: Caesalpinioideae
- Clade: Mimosoid clade
- Genus: Acacia
- Species: A. fecunda

Binomial name
- Acacia fecunda Maslin
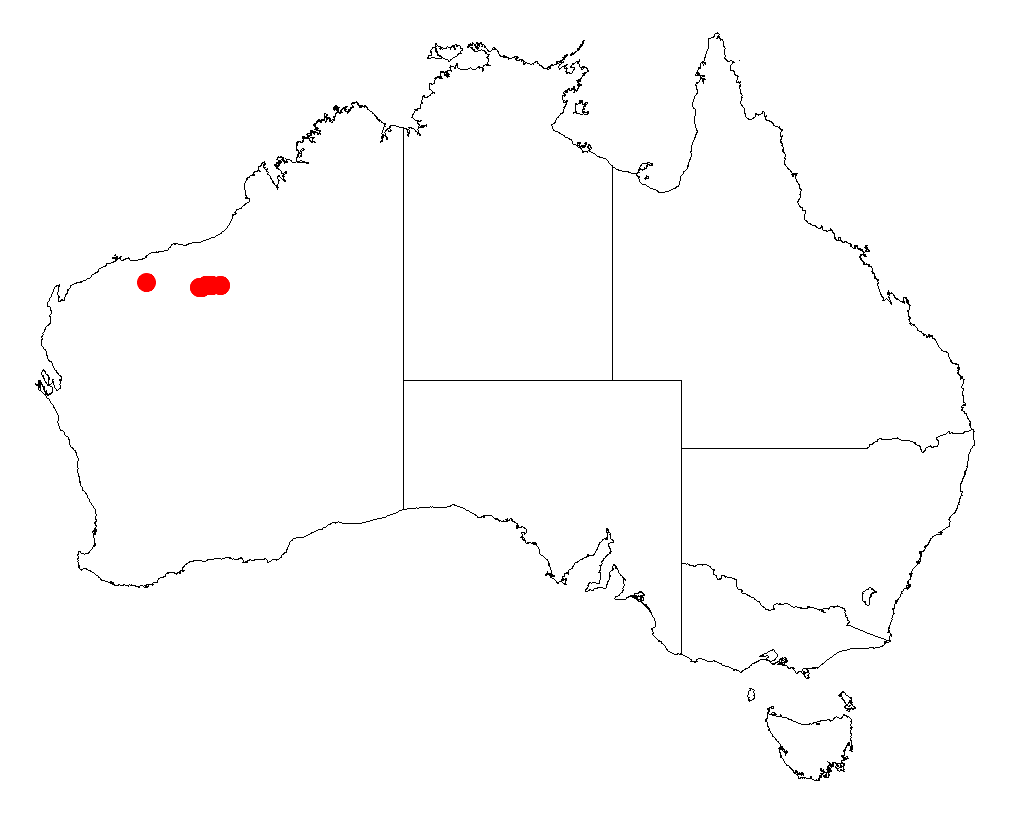
- Occurrence data from AVH

Species of legume

Acacia fecunda, commonly known as Mosquito Creek wattle, is a species of flowering plant in the family Fabaceae and is endemic to the north of Western Australia. It is a shrub with spreading, more or less open crowns, narrowly elliptic to lance-shaped phyllodes, spikes of light golden yellow flowers and linear pods, rounded over and slightly constricted between the seeds.

== Description ==
Acacia fecunda is an erect, inverted cone-shaped shrub typically grows to a height of 1.5–3 m (4 ft 11 in – 9 ft 10 in) with spreading, more or less open crowns about 3 m (9.8 ft) wide, and smooth orange or grey bark on the trunk. There are usually two to four main stems with a diameter of 4–5 cm (1.6–2.0 in) at the base of the shrub. Its branchlets are slender, terete and densely covered with white hairs. The phyllodes are wide-spreading to ascending, narrowly elliptic to lance-shaped with the narrower end towards the base, 80–120 mm (3.1–4.7 in) long and 10–15 mm (0.39–0.59 in) wide. There is a distinct pulvinus at the base of the phyllodes. The phyllodes are leathery and often slightly resinous with fine, parallel longitudinal veins. The flowers are light golden yellow, and borne in two spikes in axils, 20–40 mm (0.79–1.57 in) long and 5–6 mm (0.20–0.24 in) in diameter on peduncles 7–12 mm (0.28–0.47 in) long. Flowering occurs between May and August and the many pods are linear, 70–90 mm (2.8–3.5 in) long, 3–4 mm (0.12–0.16 in) wide, firmly papery to very thinly crusty, rounded over and slightly constricted between the seeds. The seeds are oblong, 3.5–4.0 mm (0.14–0.16 in) long and dark brown with a white aril.

== Taxonomy ==
Acacia fecunda was first formally described in 2008 by Bruce Maslin in the journal Nuytsia, from specimens he collected east of Nullagine in 2004. The specific epithet (fecunda) means 'fruitful' or 'fertile', alluding to the large number of pods produced.

== Distribution and habitat ==
Mosquito Creek wattle grows along shallow creeks and drainage lines, on hills and road verges in a few disjunct populations near where the Oakover River and Davis River meet to the east of Nullagine in the Pilbara bioregions of Western Australia.

== See also ==
- List of Acacia species
