= Yari (disambiguation) =

A yari is a Japanese weapon.

Yari may also refer to:

== Places ==
- Yari, Benin, a village
- Yari, Iran, a village in Kermanshah Province, Iran
- Yarí River, a river in Colombia
- Mount Yari, a mountain in Japan

== People ==
=== People with the surname ===
- Abbas Yari (born 1951), Iranian journalist and film critic
- Abdul'aziz Abubakar Yari (born 1968), Nigerian politician
- Akram Yari, Maoist political organizer in Afghanistan
- Al-Haj Suliman Yari (1936–2013), Afghan politician
- Ali Mohammad Yari, Paralympian athlete from Iran
- Bob Yari (born 1961), Iranian-born American film producer
- Hossein Yari (born in 1968), Iranian actor

=== People with the given name ===
- Yari Allnutt (born 1970), retired soccer player from the United States
- Yari Kirkland or Jari Kirkland (born 1976), American ski mountaineer and marathon mountain biker
- Yari Silvera (born 1976), Uruguayan former footballer

== Other uses ==
- Yari language, a spurious language of Colombia
- Sony Ericsson Yari, a mobile phone

== See also ==
- Yarri (disambiguation)
- Yarrie (disambiguation)
