= Cyclone Lua =

Category 3 Australian region tropical cyclone in 2012

Severe Tropical Cyclone Lua
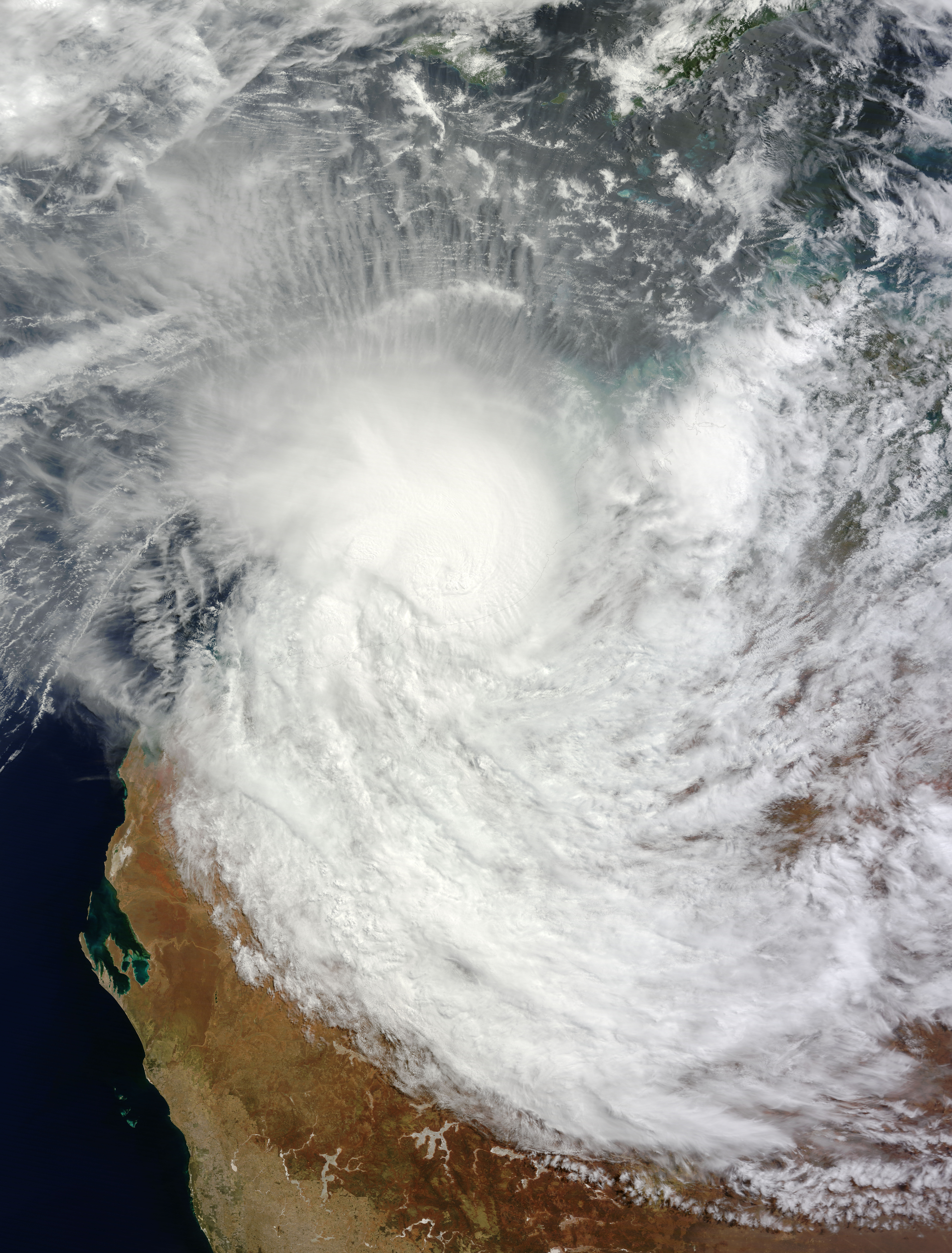
- Cyclone Lua near landfall on 17 March

Meteorological history
- Formed: 12 March 2012
- Dissipated: 18 March 2012

Category 3 severe tropical cyclone
- 10-minute sustained (BOM)
- Highest winds: 155 km/h (100 mph)
- Highest gusts: 220 km/h (140 mph)
- Lowest pressure: 935 hPa (mbar); 27.61 inHg

Category 2-equivalent tropical cyclone
- 1-minute sustained (SSHWS/JTWC)
- Highest winds: 175 km/h (110 mph)
- Lowest pressure: 952 hPa (mbar); 28.11 inHg

Overall effects
- Fatalities: None
- Damage: >$230 million (2012 USD)
- Areas affected: Western Australia
- IBTrACS
- Part of the 2011–12 Australian region cyclone season

Severe Tropical Cyclone Lua affected a sparsely populated region of Western Australia during mid-March 2012. Originating in a broad low pressure area that formed northwest of Australia by 8 March, the storm was plagued by inhibiting wind shear for the duration of its formative stages. However, it gradually organised, and received the name Lua on 13 March. The cyclone meandered for the first several days of its existence, caught between weak and competing steering currents. After the cyclone drifted northwestward, a building ridge of high pressure to the north drove Lua southeastward toward the Pilbara region. Ultimately intensifying into an upper-end Category 3 severe tropical cyclone with maximum sustained 10-minute winds of 155 km/h (96 mph), Lua made landfall near the remote community of Pardoo, about 150 km (93 mi) east of Port Hedland. It steadily weakened as it progressed south over interior Western Australia, diminishing below tropical cyclone status on 18 March.

The threat of the impending cyclone halted local industries such as oil production and iron ore mining and exporting. The Port of Port Hedland, a highly important iron ore shipping terminal, was forced to close for about 52 hours, contributing to inflated iron ore prices and delayed shipments. Multiple companies suspended work at oil fields and mines throughout the region, cutting national oil production by 25% and iron ore exports by 4.7% versus the previous month. Overall, Lua is attributed to $217 million (2012 AUD; $230 million 2012 USD) in lost revenue. Lua produced strong winds and widespread rainfall on land, but damage was limited by the lack of population in the storm's path. The Pardoo Roadhouse bore the brunt of the storm, and damage was reported at several other cattle stations and homesteads; at these sites, the storm damaged the exteriors of various structures and brought down swaths of trees. Central Western Australia endured several days of record-breaking rainfall and cool weather. The Government of Western Australia provided disaster relief funds to the hardest-hit areas, and Lua was later retired from the list of tropical cyclone names.

== Meteorological history ==
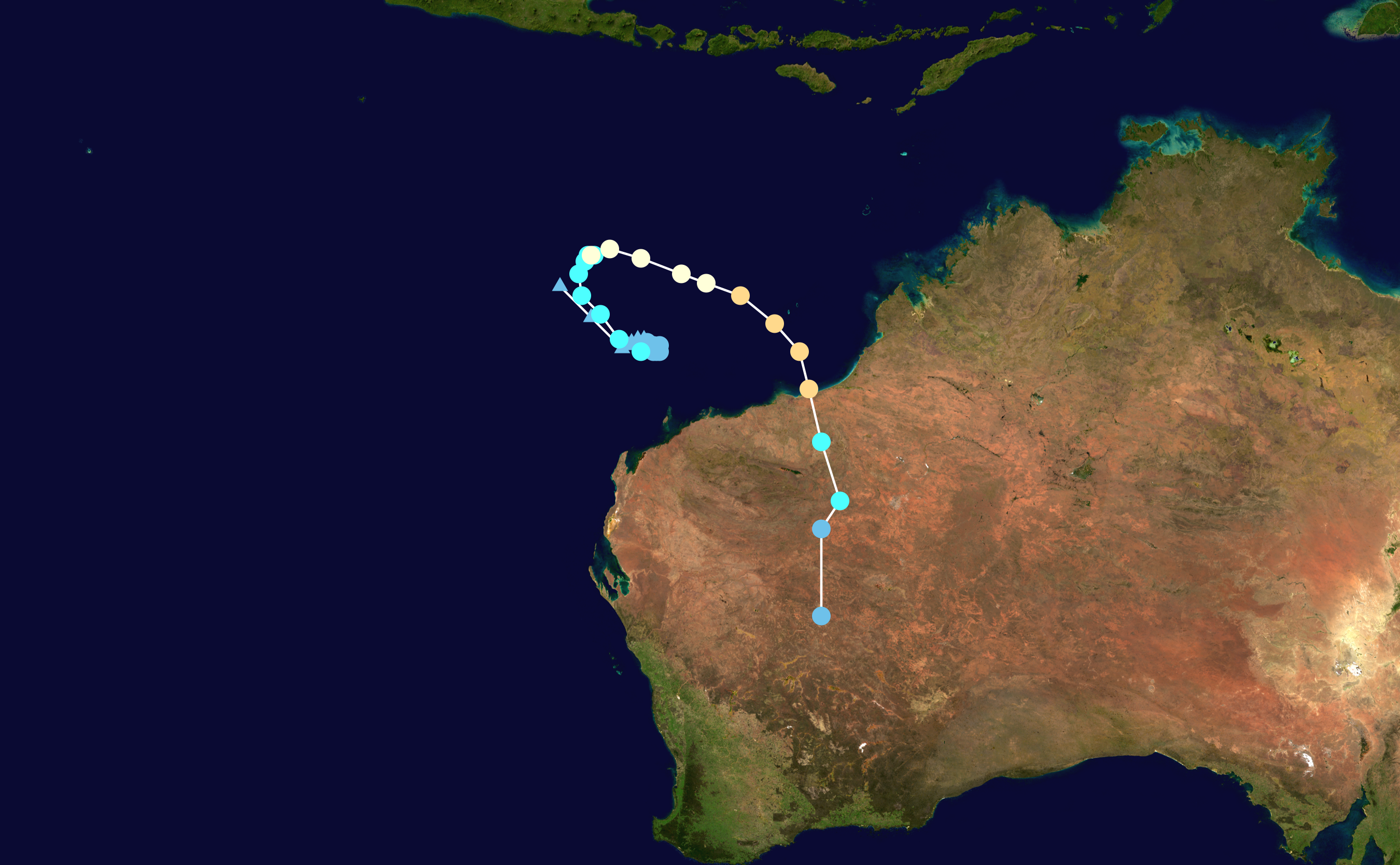
Map plotting the storm's track and intensity, according to the Saffir–Simpson scale Map key Saffir–Simpson scale Tropical depression (≤38 mph, ≤62 km/h) Tropical storm (39–73 mph, 63–118 km/h) Category 1 (74–95 mph, 119–153 km/h) Category 2 (96–110 mph, 154–177 km/h) Category 3 (111–129 mph, 178–208 km/h) Category 4 (130–156 mph, 209–251 km/h) Category 5 (≥157 mph, ≥252 km/h) Unknown Storm type Tropical cyclone Subtropical cyclone Extratropical cyclone, remnant low, tropical disturbance, or monsoon depression

Cyclone Lua originated in a broad area of disturbed weather that was spawned by a deep trough of low pressure and enhanced by a Madden–Julian oscillation pulse. The precursor to Lua was first identified through satellite imagery by 8 March 2012, while situated about 1,100 km (680 mi) to the north-northwest of Learmonth. Analysis of the disturbance revealed a diffuse low-level centre of circulation loosely bounded by sporadic, but multiplying, convection. On 9 March, the Bureau of Meteorology's (BoM) Tropical Cyclone Warning Center (TCWC) in Perth recognised the developing system and remarked on the potential for tropical cyclone formation over the following several days. The low pressure area meandered for several days, making some progress toward the east, and gradually consolidated.

By 12 March, the system had developed persistent deep convection over the eastern half of its core and organised banding features elsewhere. Moderate vertical wind shear initially hampered intensification, though the BoM designated the system Tropical Low 16U; at the time, it was centred roughly 230 km (140 mi) northwest of Karratha, Western Australia. At 2300 UTC on 12 March, the Joint Typhoon Warning Center (JTWC) issued a Tropical Cyclone Formation Alert. With increasingly favourable environmental conditions—including warm ocean waters and dwindling wind shear—the low organised significantly between 12 and 13 March, and at 0600 UTC on the 13th, TCWC Perth upgraded the low to Tropical Cyclone Lua. Simultaneously, the JTWC issued its first tropical cyclone warning on 17S. Contrary to real-time operations, the official BoM "best track" database does not list the storm as having attained Category 1 tropical cyclone intensity until 0000 UTC on 14 March.

At the time of its designation, Lua was nearly stationary in terms of forward movement, caught in the equilibrium between a blocking ridge to the southwest and increasing monsoonal winds from the northwest. The ridge began to drive Lua north-northwestward at up to 20 km/h (12 mph), before the storm resumed its slow pace on 14 March. The storm remained relatively disorganised, its strengthening limited by moderate wind shear and dry air entering its centre. Consequently, a large void of thunderstorm activity created a "horseshoe pattern". Nonetheless, Lua proved resilient, and good outflow helped compensate for the adverse shear. The southwesterly steering currents weakened, causing the storm to begin its anticipated curve toward the east and east-southeast. According to the JTWC, the storm completed a small loop as a result of competing steering factors. At the same time, the upper levels of the atmosphere became far more conducive to the cyclone's intensification, and the storm's banding pattern tightened. With a building ridge to its north, Lua accelerated east-southeastward on 15 March, and with wind shear oscillating but generally decreasing, the storm became a Category 3 severe tropical cyclone at 1800 UTC.

Continuing to intensify, Lua began to exhibit an ill-defined eye on visible satellite imagery on 16 March. The storm was expansive, producing storm-force winds in a circular area 850 km (530 mi) across. Still, the deepest convection and most favourable outflow was focused away from the eastern semicircle due to persistent light easterly wind shear. The storm's structure improved throughout the day and into the night, and at 1800 UTC on 16 March, the storm attained its peak 10-minute maximum sustained winds of 155 km/h (96 mph), classifying it as an upper-end Category 3 severe tropical cyclone. Early on 17 March, the storm turned due south toward the Pilbara coast, and the JTWC reported that Lua's peak strength was marked by 1-minute sustained winds of 175 km/h (109 mph), at 0600 UTC. At its deepest, the storm possessed a central barometric pressure of 935 hPa (27.6 inHg). Lua made landfall near Pardoo, about 150 km (93 mi) east-northeast of Port Hedland, at 0700 UTC while still at peak intensity. The cyclone steadily weakened as it progressed southward, tracking directly over the Yarrie mine before passing about halfway between Newman and Jigalong. With little extant convection and a shallow, exposed centre, Lua deteriorated below tropical cyclone status early on 18 March near Wiluna. The cyclone's remnants later entered the Goldfields-Esperance region.

== Preparations and economic impact ==
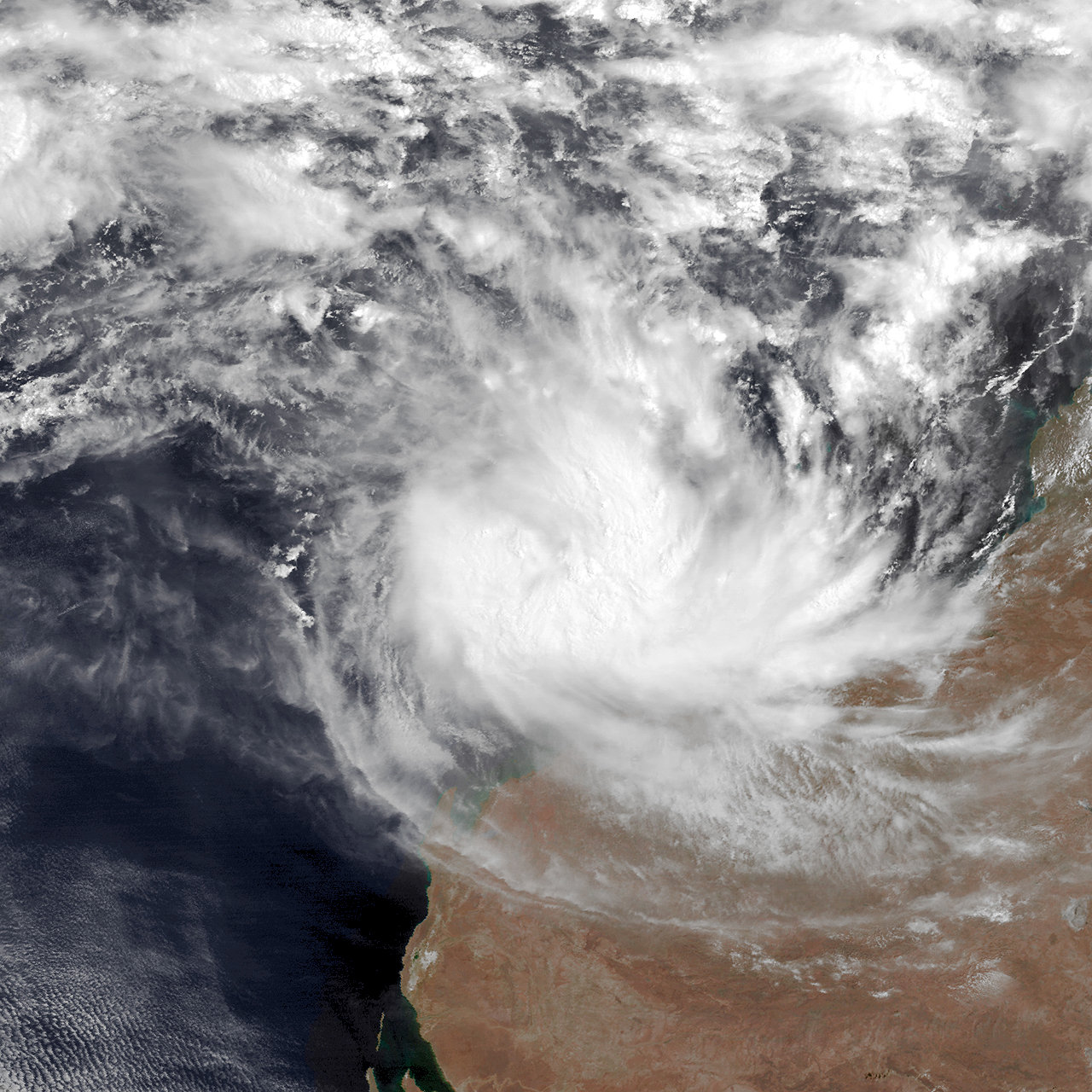
Tropical Low 16U meandering off the Australian coast on 13 March

The BoM hoisted its first Cyclone Watch on 14 March for coastal areas between Mardie Station and Cape Leveque. A Cyclone Warning was posted the next day for a smaller stretch of coastline within that range. As Lua approached the coastline, the Cyclone Warning was in place from Cape Leveque to Dampier. Communities between Bidyadanga and Port Hedland were under a Red Alert, the highest level of caution issued by the Fire and Emergency Services Authority of Western Australia (FESA). The alert advised included residents to "go to shelter immediately". Localities elsewhere between Broome and Whim Creek were on Yellow Alert, while a Blue Alert was issued between Whim Creek and Dampier, to the west of the Yellow Alert area. Work at multiple oil fields and mining sites was suspended or slowed, with non-essential staff being removed at the sites remaining in operation. It was estimated that national oil production was reduced by about 25% during the storm's approach.

Officials of the Port of Port Hedland, an important iron ore exporting terminal, closed and evacuated the port by the morning of 16 March, operating under standard emergency preparedness procedure. Overall, nearly 40 ships in the port were relocated from the port out of the path of the storm. The Port of Dampier was also closed. The Port of Port Hedland reopened to shipping on 18 March, about 52 hours after its closure, with little or no damage reported, though the downtime drove iron ore prices up for a time, and reduced exports of the raw material by 4.7% compared to the previous month. In total, Lua cost natural resources companies over $217 million (2012 AUD; $230 million 2012 USD) in stunted industry, accounting for nearly all of the monetary losses resulting from the storm.

With the destruction wrought by Cyclone Laurence in 2009 still fresh in their minds, residents, business owners, and farmers worked hurriedly to prepare their properties and livestock for Lua's onslaught. Horizon Power temporarily redirected power supply in the towns of Marble Bar and Nullagine from solar power stations to diesel generator stations. Evacuation shelters were opened to refugees of the storm with no safe living arrangements starting 16 March. About 110 individuals sought shelter at one such location in Nullagine. As the storm moved inland, flood warnings were posted throughout the Kimberley and the Pilbara, where officials closed public access to Karijini National Park. The impending cyclone forced the closure of the Great Northern and North West Coast highways, while flights to and from several airports were cancelled.

== Meteorological effects and aftermath ==
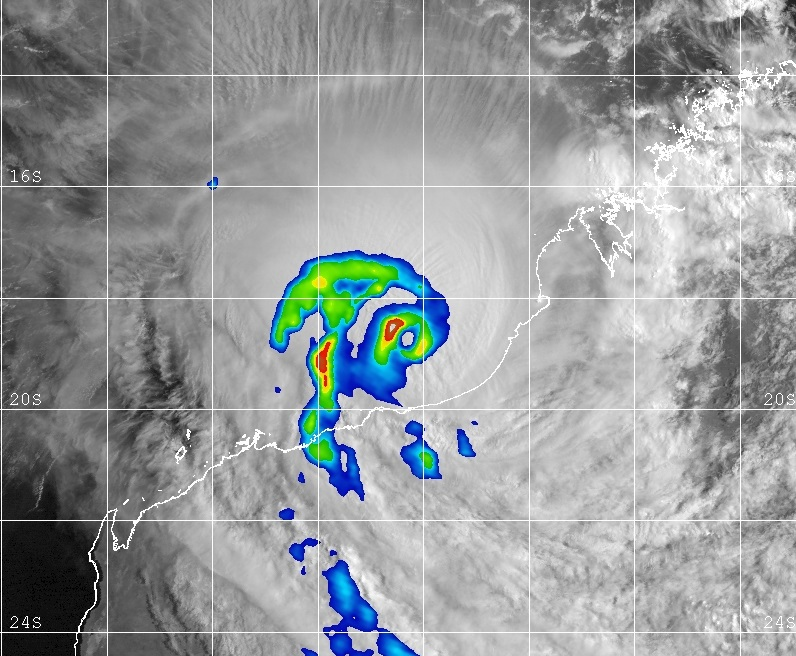
Microwave-enhanced satellite image of Lua at 0000 UTC on 17 March, at peak intensity; a well-defined centre is visible

On coming ashore, Cyclona Lua produced strong winds, gusting to 150 km/h (93 mph) at Port Hedland, and appreciable rainfall, peaking at 88.6 mm (3.49 in) at Bidyadanga. The precipitation was widespread, affecting a large area of interior Western Australia. The overcast weather led to abnormally cool temperatures, which broke monthly records in portions of the central and eastern Pilbara. For instance, the Port Hedland Airport recorded a maximum temperature of 24.1 °C on 17 March, the coldest March day in the station's history; the previous record of 25.8 °C was set 64 years prior. As the remnants of Lua continued poleward, they continued to drop heavy rainfall, including a daily total (19 March) of 75.0 mm (2.95 in) at Edjudina, setting the record for the wettest March day there. A barometer reading of 939 hPa (27.7 inHg) at Rowley Shoals represented the lowest observed pressure associated with the storm.

Striking a relatively isolated area, the cyclone's effects were limited, and no fatalities or injuries were reported. Indeed, a FESA official noted that initial reports of damage were "scant". Preliminary assessments suggested that Pardoo Roadhouse and the small surrounding community bore the brunt of the storm, as most towns and farms in the region escaped relatively unscathed. The manager of the roadhouse relayed that the height of the storm was "absolutely horrific", downing numerous trees and causing some structural damage. Some destruction was also observed at the Yarrie Homestead, where return to normalcy was expected to take as long as 12 months. Numerous buildings on the Warrawagine Homestead sustained damage such as compromised roofs and doors, which amounted to an estimated $70,000 (2012 AUD; 74,000 2012 USD). Several head of cattle were killed by the storm. Moderate to major flooding took place in several areas, especially along the De Grey River drainage basin, though the rainfall proved beneficial in much of the climatologically dry area. The above-normal precipitation allowed farmers to get a head-start on planting winter crops.

In the aftermath of the storm, the Western Australia state government allocated relief funds to offset the cost of recovery and clean-up in several of the affected towns. Individuals and families became eligible to apply for personal grants and small business owners would be considered for special interest rates on new loans. Local government entities listed under the proclamation were the shires of Ashburton, Broome, East Pilbara, Meekatharra, and the Town of Port Hedland. Disaster assistance money in these jurisdictions would be used to restore public assets and infrastructure impaired by the storm. The name Lua was later retired from the cyclical list of tropical cyclone names due to the system's adverse effects on land and was replaced by the name Luana.

== See also ==
- Cyclone Yasi, which struck Queensland in early 2011
- Cyclone Laurence, which struck Western Australia in late 2009
- Cyclones Rusty (2013), Kelvin (2018) and Ilsa (2023), which all made landfall in the same region between Port Hedland and Broome as severe tropical cyclones after Lua
- Cyclones Gwenda (1999) and Inigo (2003), tied for the strongest Australian region tropical cyclones on record; both would strike Western Australia after peaking in strength.
