= Yarrie =

Yarrie may refer to:

- Yarrie Station; a pastoral lease now functioning as a cattle station, in Pilbara, Western Australia, Australia
- Yarrie mine; an iron ore mine, operated by BHP Billington, in Pilbara, Western Australia, Australia
- Yarrie homestead, on Yarrie Road, on the De Grey River, in northwest Western Australia, Australia, see List of homesteads in Western Australia: X–Z
- Yarrie, Goldfields-Esperance, Western Australia, Australia; the region around the town of Yarri, Western Australia
- Yarri (Wiradjuri) also spelled "Yarrie", aka Coonong Denamundinna (1810-1880), an aboriginal Australian man and local hero

== See also ==
- Yarri (disambiguation)
- Yari (disambiguation)
