= Yarri (disambiguation) =

Yarri is a common name of Eucalyptus patens, a species of flowering plant in the family Myrtaceae.

Yarri may also refer to:

- Queensland tiger (or yarri), a cryptid found in Queensland, Australia
- Yarri, Western Australia, an abandoned town in Australia
- Yarri (Wiradjuri) a.k.a. Coonong Denamundinna (1810-1880), an aboriginal Australian man and local hero
- Iyarri (Yarri), a god worshiped in Anatolia in the Bronze Age

== See also ==
- Yari (disambiguation)
- Yarrie (disambiguation)
