= De Grey Station =

Pastoral lease in Western Australia

Coordinates: 20°10′32″S 119°11′29″E

Location in Western Australia

De Grey Station is a pastoral lease, formerly a sheep station and now a cattle station, approximately 80 kilometres (50 mi) east of Port Hedland on the mouth of the De Grey River in the Pilbara region of Western Australia.

Pardoo Station was established as an outstation of De Grey in 1869 and has a size of over 200,000 hectares (494,211 acres). The station has sheep, breeding mares and camels and now runs 6,000 head of cattle.

== History ==
De Grey is the earliest pastoral lease in Western Australia, dating from 1862. The property was owned by Samuel Peter Mackay in 1875 and was briefly managed by George Julius Brockman for three months of the same year while Mackay travelled to Melbourne.

Alexander Forrest, the Western Australian explorer and surveyor, began his historic 1879 expedition from De Grey River Station, leaving on 25 February 1879 and "receiving much kind assistance from Mr Anderson" before travelling with his party overland to Condon.

The station occupied almost 3,000,000 acres (1,214,057 ha) in 1886 when it was owned by Messrs Grant, Anderson and Edgar. The owners had acquired an additional area from a neighbouring lease that had been abandoned by Messrs Padbury and Co when the price of wool was quite low. At this time the property was divided into 16 paddocks separated by about 200 miles (322 km) of six-wire sheep-proof fencing and all with water tanks supplied by the De Grey River.

The area was struck by a cyclone in 1889 with a number of houses being destroyed, miles of fencing being torn up and the loss of over 1,300 sheep.

In 1906 shearing produced 700 bales of wool, with over 43,000 sheep being shorn.

The Rubin family bought the lease on the property in 1912 for A£100,000 with 75,000 sheep and provided the wool for the uniforms of the British Expeditionary Force in 1914. In 1916 they added Mulyie, Ettrick and Warrawagine Stations, including Nullagine and de Vahl Outstations. Major Harold de Vahl Rubin ran the properties from 1919 to 1965. They made the transfer to cattle in the 1970s with David Rubin as manager.

The station was visited by MacRobertson's party twice during the Round Australia Expedition in 1928, once on the way to Port Hedland and then on the journey to Broome. At this time the manager of the station was John Stewart, and 30,000 sheep were being run on the property. The party stayed in the brick homestead, outbuildings and shearing shed during their visit.

Atlas Iron began mining and shipping iron ore from the Pardoo mine site in 2008; the mine site takes up 278 hectares (687 acres) on the station and is situated approximately 10 kilometres (6 mi) south from the station homestead.

Mark Bettini, the station manager at De Grey in 2006, re-established the native Mitchell grass in preference to the introduced buffel grass to combat the spread of Parkinsonia in the area. He reported that Mitchell grass grows better in clay areas and is just as nutritious to cattle.

Bettini was still the lessee in 2012 with 35 000 head of cattle; De Grey is operating under the Crown Lease number CL167-1980 and has the Land Act number LA3114/1142.

== See also ==
- List of ranches and stations
- List of pastoral leases in Western Australia
- List of the largest stations in Australia
