= List of homesteads in Western Australia: L =

This list includes all homesteads in Western Australia with a gazetted name. It is complete with respect to the 1996 Gazetteer of Australia. Dubious names have been checked against the online 2004 data, and in all cases confirmed correct. However, if any homesteads have been gazetted or deleted since 1996, this list does not reflect these changes. Strictly speaking, Australian place names are gazetted in capital letters only; the names in this list have been converted to mixed case in accordance with normal capitalisation conventions.

Name	Location	Remarks
La Cuesta	29°40′S 115°51′E	
La Prairie	33°31′S 122°3′E	
La-vie-ville	33°59′S 117°39′E	
Labianca	34°7′S 119°4′E	
Ladycroft	34°12′S 115°57′E	
Lager Downs	33°44′S 117°3′E	
Lake Banks Estate	34°12′S 117°40′E	
Lake Barlee	29°9′S 119°1′E	
Lake Erie	34°46′S 117°38′E	
Lake Flats	32°24′S 118°4′E	
Lake Magenta Farms	33°26′S 119°15′E	
Lake Mason	27°35′S 119°31′E	
Lake Mears	32°14′S 117°21′E	
Lake Mungala	31°26′S 115°54′E	
Lake Nerramyne	27°45′S 115°26′E	
Lake View	31°12′S 116°50′E	
Lake View	33°44′S 117°8′E	
Lake View	33°51′S 120°48′E	
Lake View	30°38′S 115°59′E	
Lake View	34°25′S 117°24′E	
Lake View	33°20′S 117°24′E	
Lake Violet	26°32′S 120°40′E	
Lake Way	26°57′S 120°28′E	
Lake Wells	27°17′S 123°0′E	
Lake-side	33°4′S 115°43′E	
Lakeside	33°25′S 117°18′E	
Lakeside	33°23′S 117°21′E	
Lakeside	27°38′S 117°29′E	
Lakeside	33°3′S 119°2′E	
Lakeview	34°46′S 117°38′E	
Lalla Rhook	33°23′S 117°10′E	
Lalla Rookh	20°53′S 119°8′E	
Lamanbandah Aboriginal Outstation	21°21′S 127°51′E	
Lamannaw	31°7′S 115°58′E	
Lamboo	18°28′S 127°21′E	
Lamda	28°36′S 115°4′E	
Land Mark	31°18′S 115°32′E	
Landor	25°8′S 116°54′E	
Landsdale	29°59′S 116°5′E	
Langaweira	33°45′S 117°44′E	
Langford	29°57′S 115°13′E	
Langham	33°10′S 115°52′E	
Langton	34°39′S 117°33′E	
Langvale	33°49′S 122°13′E	
Langwell	33°53′S 117°34′E	
Langwood	31°9′S 116°20′E	
Lansdown	32°31′S 115°56′E	
Lansdowne	17°37′S 126°45′E	
Lareema	31°40′S 116°5′E	
Larkin Outcamp	29°23′S 122°11′E	
Larnook	34°15′S 117°55′E	
Larrawa	18°50′S 126°31′E	
Lassagowrie	34°16′S 117°35′E	
Last Chance Outcamp	29°3′S 120°58′E	
Lauder Downs	33°36′S 116°31′E	
Laurel Downs	18°7′S 125°20′E	
Laureldene	33°30′S 115°41′E	
Laurinya	33°47′S 119°10′E	
Lauriston	32°13′S 118°3′E	
Laverton Downs	28°28′S 122°26′E	
Lavinjane	34°1′S 115°5′E	
Lawlers	31°35′S 116°51′E	
Lawloit Park	33°3′S 116°56′E	
Lawnswood	31°42′S 116°31′E	
Lazy B	33°1′S 119°3′E	
Lazy B	32°35′S 116°33′E	
Lazy G	33°50′S 117°46′E	
Lazy J	34°30′S 115°59′E	
Leadale	33°51′S 117°4′E	
Leahurst	33°28′S 115°44′E	
Leatherhead	31°34′S 116°20′E	
Lee-dale	34°16′S 115°26′E	
Leecroft	33°46′S 115°7′E	
Leeuwin	33°53′S 115°4′E	
Lefroy	29°19′S 115°15′E	
Leinster Downs	27°51′S 120°36′E	
Leithgow	32°19′S 116°3′E	
Lenham	34°19′S 117°36′E	
Lennard Brook Downs	31°21′S 115°59′E	
Lennoch Park	33°40′S 121°59′E	
Lennox	33°44′S 115°14′E	
Lennox	33°40′S 115°11′E	
Lennox	22°55′S 146°9′E	
Lenore	33°58′S 116°30′E	
Lenton Brae	33°47′S 115°2′E	
Lenzie	33°49′S 117°17′E	
Leopold Downs	17°45′S 125°23′E	
Leschenaultia	33°28′S 115°49′E	
Lester Vale	33°46′S 116°0′E	
Lewis Creek	19°11′S 128°32′E	
Lewona	31°41′S 116°2′E	
Lexden	33°34′S 115°35′E	
Ley-burn	33°58′S 116°22′E	
Liberty Stud	33°42′S 115°7′E	
Lillipilli	33°47′S 118°52′E	
Lilly Dale	33°43′S 117°2′E	
Lillydale	31°40′S 116°41′E	
Lillydale	33°12′S 116°54′E	
Lilydale	33°43′S 115°48′E	
Lilyvale	33°19′S 115°48′E	
Limestone	21°11′S 119°49′E	
Limestone Park	31°19′S 115°42′E	
Linda Valley Park	32°58′S 117°27′E	
Linddabet Stud	33°45′S 115°24′E	
Linden	33°25′S 115°45′E	
Linden Lea	33°33′S 119°34′E	
Linden Wood	33°20′S 117°34′E	
Linders Fern	29°16′S 115°53′E	
Lindimar	34°32′S 117°8′E	
Lindon	33°59′S 117°58′E	
Lindross	33°46′S 115°5′E	
Linga Longa	30°18′S 116°3′E	
Linga Longa	32°57′S 117°21′E	
Linga Longa	33°10′S 115°45′E	
Linkletters Place	33°46′S 122°34′E	
Linndener	31°31′S 116°38′E	
Linton	32°20′S 118°5′E	
Linton Bore	26°7′S 127°54′E	
Linton Park	32°49′S 117°12′E	
Lintondale	33°28′S 115°50′E	
Linwood	33°8′S 119°11′E	
Liscombe	34°33′S 118°21′E	
Lisnadell	33°8′S 116°57′E	
Lissadell	16°41′S 128°33′E	
Little Dowlering	33°33′S 117°9′E	
Little Holland	33°40′S 115°21′E	
Little Meadows	33°1′S 116°53′E	
Liveringa	18°3′S 124°10′E	
Llanfair	32°35′S 117°16′E	
Llantrisant	33°49′S 115°20′E	
Lloalong	33°38′S 118°10′E	
Llyamba	32°50′S 117°55′E	
Lochcair	33°2′S 118°53′E	
Lockville	33°37′S 115°25′E	
Lockyer	31°32′S 116°38′E	
Logan Park	32°42′S 117°47′E	
Loma Langi	33°43′S 117°43′E	
Lombardia	33°59′S 117°24′E	
Lombardy Farm	29°55′S 115°46′E	
Lone Pine	33°53′S 117°52′E	
Lone Plain Farm	33°39′S 115°30′E	
Long Acres	32°29′S 116°47′E	
Long Forest	31°21′S 116°38′E	
Long Valley	33°48′S 117°21′E	
Long View	33°38′S 117°55′E	
Longbottom	33°40′S 115°46′E	
Longfield	31°39′S 116°47′E	
Longforest	29°52′S 116°10′E	
Longley	31°12′S 116°10′E	
Longreach	33°27′S 117°1′E	
Longreach	33°6′S 119°17′E	
Longreach	30°14′S 116°1′E	
Longview	33°24′S 117°54′E	
Longview	32°19′S 117°19′E	
Lons Valley	33°52′S 116°11′E	
Lonsdale	33°45′S 117°6′E	
Lookout Spring Outstation	15°21′S 128°50′E	
Lorendano	33°30′S 115°47′E	
Loretta Downs	33°40′S 122°43′E	
Lorinna	33°39′S 122°1′E	
Lorna Glen	26°14′S 121°33′E	
Lorraine Farm	33°39′S 117°27′E	
Lort Heights	33°31′S 121°22′E	
Lort River Downs	33°17′S 121°23′E	
Lostbiscca	34°7′S 115°7′E	
Lothlorien	33°41′S 115°5′E	
Loton	33°55′S 116°35′E	
Loton	33°42′S 120°49′E	
Louisa Downs	18°43′S 126°43′E	
Louriana	33°36′S 121°29′E	
Lovat Downs	33°26′S 119°43′E	
Loveland	33°44′S 116°44′E	
Low Lands	33°48′S 117°44′E	
Lowana	33°33′S 122°10′E	
Lowdale	33°48′S 115°48′E	
Lowlands	32°20′S 115°54′E	
Lowlands	33°40′S 117°19′E	
Lucknow	32°24′S 118°26′E	
Lucky Bay	33°49′S 122°20′E	
Ludlow Park	33°36′S 115°28′E	
Lugano	33°18′S 121°9′E	
Luipi	33°10′S 116°54′E	
Lukenda	33°34′S 121°39′E	
Luluigui	18°9′S 124°2′E	
Lumeah	33°4′S 115°53′E	
Lupin Valley	30°42′S 115°49′E	
Lupine Park	34°14′S 115°9′E	
Luscombe	34°12′S 117°10′E	
Lyndhurst	33°16′S 117°21′E	
Lyndhurst	34°22′S 116°56′E	
Lyndhurst	34°1′S 117°53′E	
Lyndhurst	33°4′S 116°37′E	
Lyndon	23°38′S 115°15′E	
Lyndon	34°2′S 117°16′E	
Lynella	33°30′S 117°26′E	
Lynella	34°59′S 117°38′E	
Lynford	33°10′S 116°37′E	
Lynlea	33°36′S 122°2′E	
Lynlea	34°20′S 117°10′E	
Lynville	33°12′S 117°32′E	
Lynwood	33°57′S 117°44′E	
Lynwood	34°46′S 117°21′E	
Lynwood	33°41′S 115°14′E	
Lynwood Park	33°14′S 115°51′E	
Lyons River	24°38′S 115°20′E	

== See also ==
- List of pastoral leases in Western Australia
