= Bedout Island =

Island in Western Australia

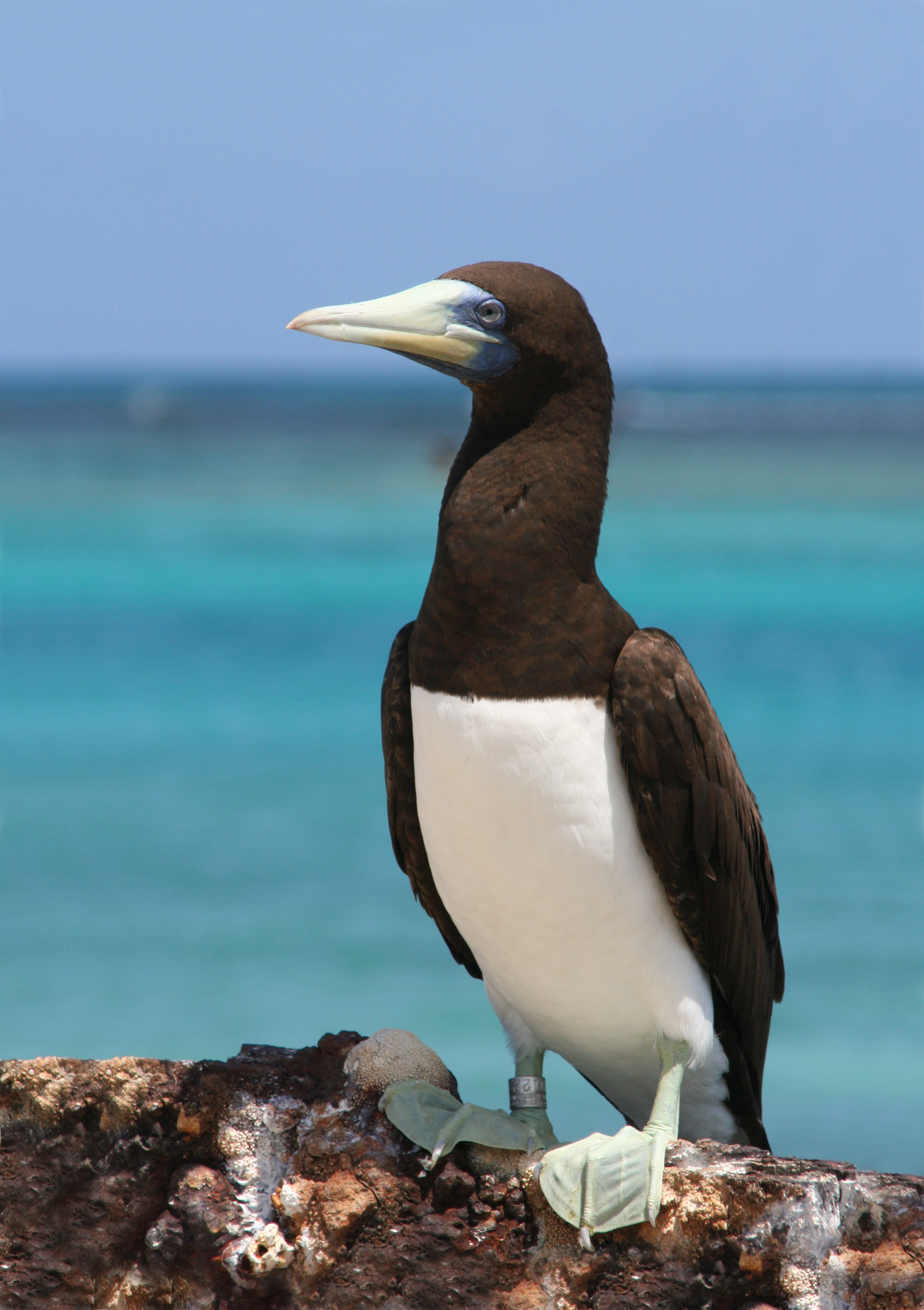
- Bedout Island is a breeding site of world importance for the Brown booby
- Location of Bedout Island in Western Australia
- Location within Western Australia

Geography
- Location: Indian Ocean
- Coordinates: 19°34′40″S 119°05′40″E
- Highest elevation: 7 m (23 ft)

Administration
- Australia
- State: Western Australia
- LGA: Town of Port Hedland

Bedout Island is a small Western Australian island on the Pilbara coast. It lies 42 kilometres (26 mi) offshore from Larrey Point and the mouth of the De Grey River, and 96 kilometres (60 mi) north-east of Port Hedland.

It was named by Baudin during his exploration in the early 1800s after Jacques Bedout.

== Geography ==
Bedout is a low and undulating, 31-hectare (77-acre) sandy cay on limestone bedrock, heavily vegetated with beach spinifex. A navigational beacon is found in the centre of the island. There are three listed shipwrecks in the surrounding waters, all wrecked between 1890 and 1912. At some time in the past black rats were inadvertently introduced, probably by visiting pearling vessels in the late 19th century, but were eradicated in 1991.

=== Climate ===
Bedout Island has a tropical desert climate (Köppen: BWh); with a highly erratic rainfall due to receiving precipitation from irregular tropical cyclones. Extreme temperatures have ranged from 40.2 °C (104.4 °F) on 20 November 2015 to 13.0 °C (55.4 °F) on 13 July 2006.

Climate data for Bedout Island (19.59°S 119.10°E) (9 m (30 ft) AMSL) (2005-2025)
Month	Jan	Feb	Mar	Apr	May	Jun	Jul	Aug	Sep	Oct	Nov	Dec	Year
Record high °C (°F)	37.3 (99.1)	38.2 (100.8)	39.9 (103.8)	37.0 (98.6)	34.0 (93.2)	31.0 (87.8)	29.7 (85.5)	31.6 (88.9)	34.1 (93.4)	38.0 (100.4)	40.2 (104.4)	38.6 (101.5)	40.2 (104.4)
Mean daily maximum °C (°F)	33.5 (92.3)	33.5 (92.3)	33.6 (92.5)	32.6 (90.7)	28.8 (83.8)	25.8 (78.4)	25.0 (77.0)	26.3 (79.3)	28.8 (83.8)	31.1 (88.0)	32.4 (90.3)	33.5 (92.3)	30.4 (86.7)
Mean daily minimum °C (°F)	27.4 (81.3)	27.5 (81.5)	27.6 (81.7)	27.1 (80.8)	23.7 (74.7)	21.1 (70.0)	19.7 (67.5)	20.3 (68.5)	22.2 (72.0)	24.4 (75.9)	26.0 (78.8)	27.2 (81.0)	24.5 (76.1)
Record low °C (°F)	21.4 (70.5)	22.7 (72.9)	22.1 (71.8)	19.3 (66.7)	17.9 (64.2)	15.9 (60.6)	13.0 (55.4)	16.7 (62.1)	18.0 (64.4)	18.0 (64.4)	21.9 (71.4)	23.0 (73.4)	13.0 (55.4)
Source: Bureau of Meteorology (2005-2025)

== Status ==
The island is an A-class nature reserve, managed by the Department of Environment and Conservation. It is part of the Western Australian Coastal Islands (Dixon Island to Cape Keraudren) site which is listed on Australia's Register of the National Estate. It is also classified by BirdLife International as an Important Bird Area because of its seabird breeding colonies.

The Bedout Island Nature Reserve was declared in 1975 and has a size of 31 hectares (77 acres).

== Birds ==
The island supports over 1,000 nesting pairs of brown boobies, making it one of the largest colonies in Western Australia. This species regularly incorporates anthropogenic debris into its nests, presumably mistaking items for nesting materials, including on Bedout Island where around 5% of over 700 nests surveyed in 2016 and 2017 contained debris (primarily hard plastic fragments, rope, and fishing line).

Bedout Island is also home to over 1,000 nesting pairs each of common noddies and crested terns, 500–1,000 lesser frigatebirds, 100–500 masked boobies, as well as lesser crested, roseate and sooty terns, silver gulls and white-bellied sea eagles. Many of these do not breed elsewhere in the Pilbara. The main breeding season comprises the winter months from May to September.
