= Nullagine River =

River in Pilbara region of Western Australia

Coordinates: 20°43′46″S 120°34′13″E

Location
- Country: Australia

Physical characteristics
- Source
  - elevation: 500 m (1,640 ft)
- Mouth
  - location: De Grey River
  - elevation: 123 m (404 ft)
- Length: 296 km (184 mi)
- Basin size: 875.2 km^{2} (337.9 sq mi)
- Discharge
  - average: 62,410 ML/a (1.978 m^{3}/s; 69.84 cu ft/s)

The Nullagine River is a river in the Pilbara region of Western Australia.

The headwaters of the river rise south of Bonney Downs and then flow in a northerly direction. The river crosses the Marble Bar road at Nullagine and continues to flow in a north-easterly direction until it merges with the Oakover River to form the De Grey River. The river is bounded by the Chichester Range in the south.

The river flows through several permanent pools on its journey, including Garden Pool, Rock Pool, Tumbinna Pool and Cordooin Pool.

The river periodically floods during the wet season and can cut roads in the area as a result.

The Nullagine river has 19 tributaries, including Beaton Creek, Bookabunna Creek, Walgunya Creek, Wild Dog Creek and Connabunna Creek.

The name of the river is an Indigenous Australian word that was first recorded as Ngullagine in the 1880s. The meaning of the word is not known.
