= Yari, Iran =

Yari ياري
- Village
- Location within Iran
- Coordinates: 34°49′35″N 46°27′22″E
- Country: Iran
- Province: Kermanshah
- County: Javanrud
- Bakhsh: Central
- Rural District: Palanganeh

Population (2006)
  - Total: 397
- Time zone: UTC+3:30 (IRST)
  - Summer (DST): UTC+4:30 (IRDT)

Yari (Persian: ياري, also Romanized as Yārī; also known as Yāreh) is a village in Palanganeh Rural District, in the Central District of Javanrud County, Kermanshah Province, Iran. At the 2006 census, its population was 397, in 79 families.
