= Coongan River =

River in Western Australia

Coordinates: 20°34′52″S 119°35′30″E

Location
- Country: Australia

Physical characteristics
- Source
  - location: Chichester Range
  - elevation: 480 metres (1,575 ft)
- Mouth
  - location: De Grey River
  - elevation: 46 metres (151 ft)
- Length: 200 km (120 mi)
- Basin size: 3,740 km^{2} (1,440 sq mi)
- Discharge
  - average: 80 GL/a (90 cu ft/s)

The Coongan River is an ephemeral river in the Pilbara region of Western Australia.

The headwaters of the river rise below the Chichester Range. The river flows in a northerly direction past Marble Bar then through the Gorge Range before discharging into the De Grey River, of which it is a tributary, at Mulyie Pool near Mount Woodhouse.

The town of Marble Bar also draws approximately 180ML scheme water from the river's alluvium per year.

The river has eight tributaries, including Talga River, Triberton Creek, Emu Creek and Budjan Creek.

The name is Indigenous Australian in origin, and was first recorded in 1878 by Alexander Forrest. The traditional owners of the area are the Njamal or Nyamal people.

The rivers water quality varies dependent of the flow but the average turbidity of the river water is 587 NTU and the average salinity is 100 mg/L.
