= Pardoo Station =

Pastoral lease in Western Australia

Coordinates: 20°06′24″S 119°34′48″E

Location in Western Australia

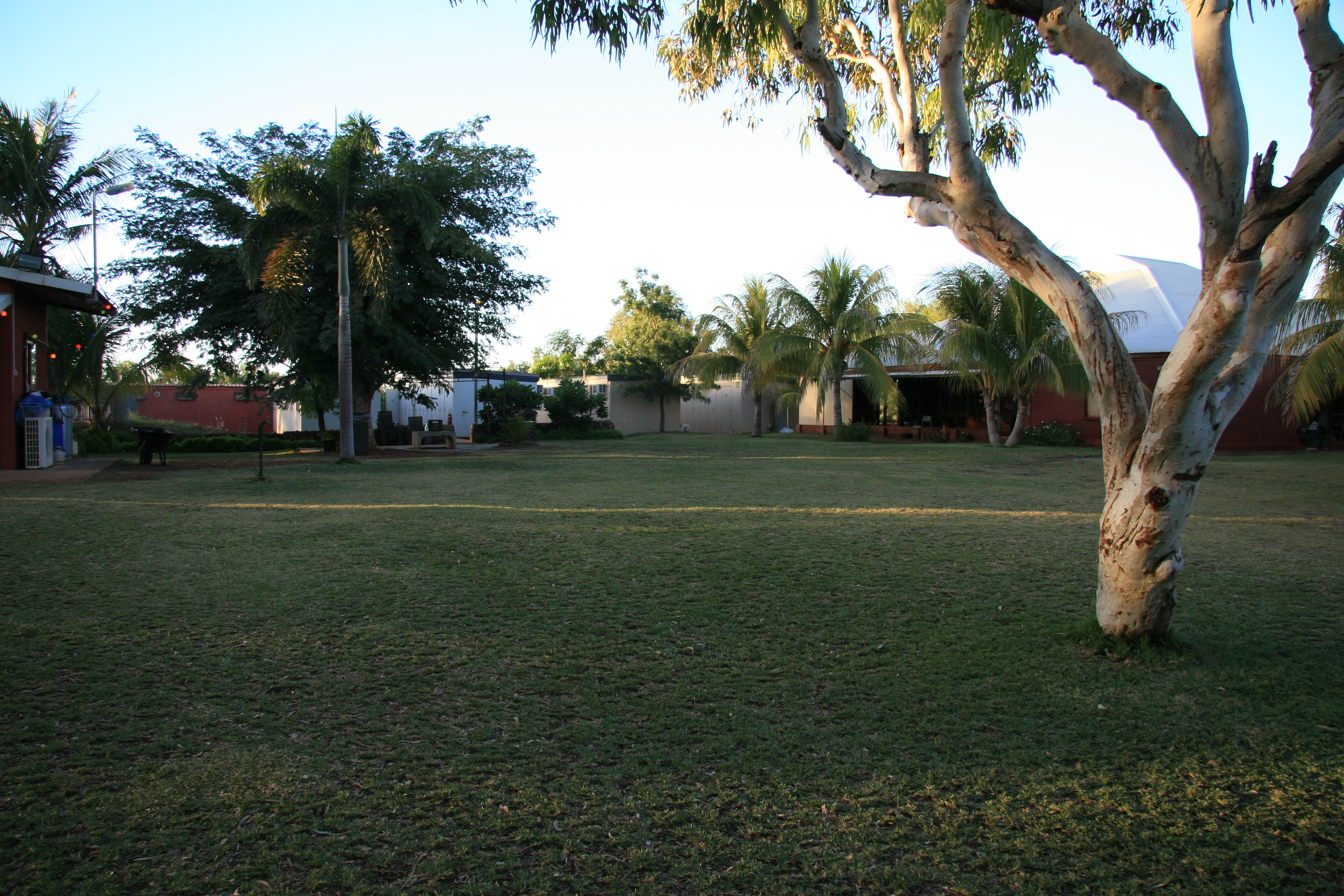
Pardoo homestead, 2008

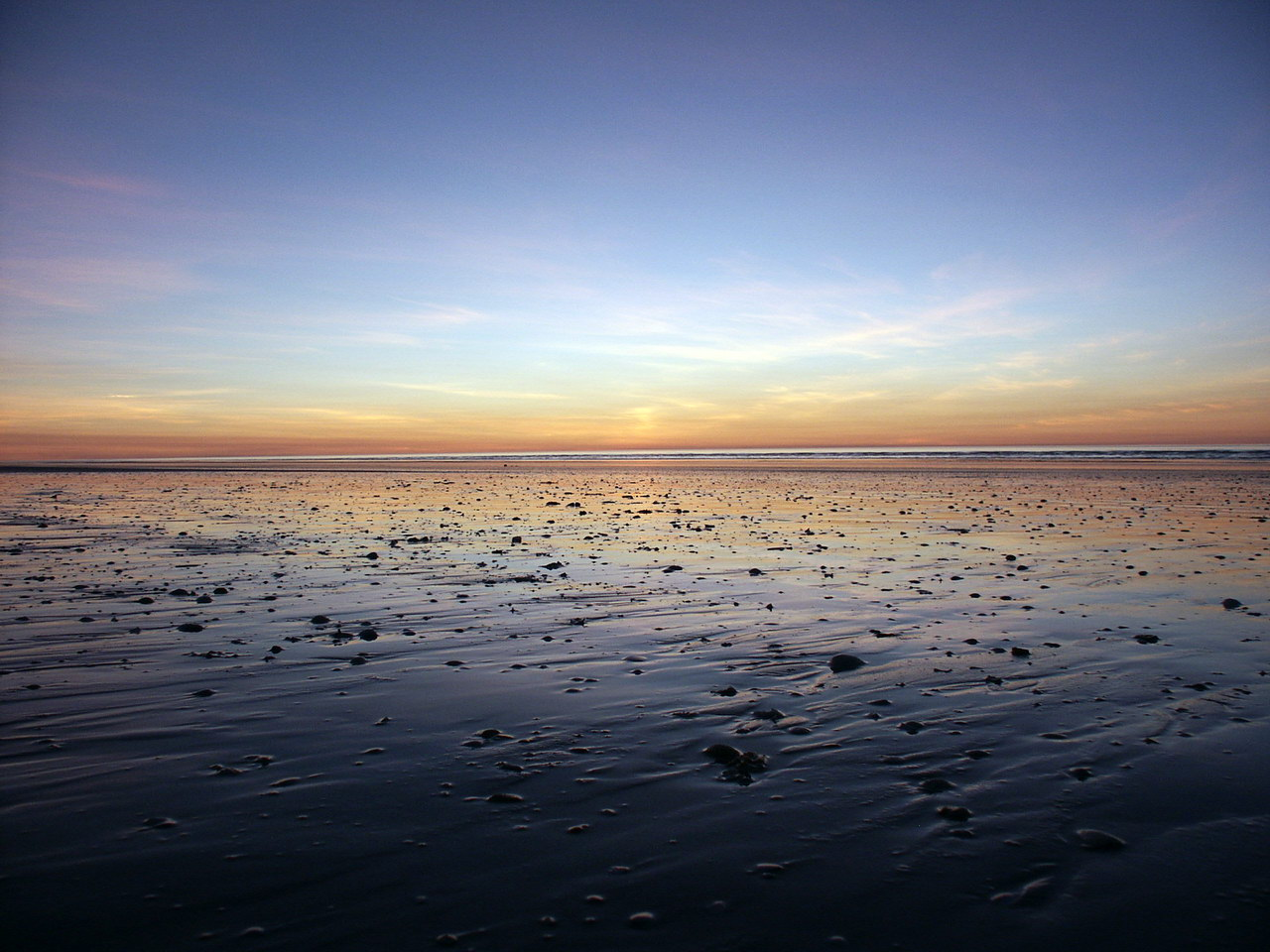
Eighty Mile Beach

Pardoo Station is a pastoral lease, formerly a sheep station, and now a cattle station approximately 120 kilometres (75 mi) east of Port Hedland and 121 kilometres (75 mi) north of Marble Bar, in the Pilbara region of Western Australia.

== Description ==
The property used to be about 250,000 acres (1,000 km^{2}) in size. It is on the western end of the Great Sandy Desert where it meets the Indian Ocean at the southern end of the Eighty Mile Beach.

Mount Goldsworthy, located on the south western side of the lease, is the site of the first iron ore mine in the Pilbara. The Pardoo iron ore mine is located in the region, and shares the station's name.

The station was sold in late 2014 by the Rogers family to a Singaporean-based investor, Bruce Cheung, for A$13.5 million. Cheung's company, the Pardoo Beef Corporation, appointed Eric Golangco as the general manager. At this time the property was running 5,700 head of cattle on 1,998 square kilometres (771 sq mi). Centre-pivot irrigation is being used to produce extra hay for stock. The property also has 60 kilometres (37 mi) of ocean frontage and has a 145-bay caravan park tourist operation.

== History ==
Mr S. Anderson was the proprietor of the station in 1892. Heavy rains in April of that year led to heavy stock losses with around 100 cattle, 1,500 sheep and 30 horses being lost in the deluge. In May of the same year he was thrown from his horse and sustained severe injuries, which resulted in him being taken to Roebourne for hospitalisation.

Seven Aboriginal Australians were caught killing and stealing sheep from the station in 1893. They were sentenced to four years hard labour and eighteen lashes with the cat o' nine tails.

In 1913 the station had an estimated flock of 20,000 sheep, which were to be shorn using the 12 stands in the shearing shed in July of that year.

The area was flooded following heavy rains in 1929.

Frank Snellgrove Thompson owned the station from at least 1929 until his death in 1937. His son, Frank Finlayson Thompson, took over control of the property until at least 1951, in addition to the family merino stud property Nardlah near Broomehill in the Great Southern region of the state.

In 1951 a seventy-year-old man, Hans Pederson, fell 30 feet (9.1 m) from a windmill tower. The Royal Flying Doctor Service sent a plane from Port Hedland but it arrived too late and Pederson had died.

Pardoo was an outcamp of De Grey Station but became a separate entity owned by the Thompson family until 1963 when Frank Thompson sold it to Leslie (Les) Schubert. Schubert describes the history of the station in his book Wiping Out the Tracks – The Northern Odyssey.

In November 1965 Schubert swapped Pardoo along with a cash adjustment of $120,000 for Louisa Downs and Bohemia Downs stations in the Kimberley region. Karl Stein took over the station in January 1966.

Sometime before 1977 Karl Stein retired and sold Pardoo to Russel Peake. The Leeds family purchased Pardoo from Peake and then sold the lease for Pardoo to Graeme and Judith Rogers. Pardoo is operating under the Crown Lease numbers CL694-1967 and CL194-1983 and has the associated Land Act numbers LA3114/446 and LA398/718.

The station is estimated to have a size of 500,000 acres (2,000 km^{2}) and in 2012 was stocked with approximately 7,000 Santa Gertrudis cattle.

== Tropical cyclones ==
In 2012 the station lay directly in the path of Cyclone Lua and most staff were evacuated to Port Hedland to wait the storm out. The Anderson family and two station hands remained at the property. The area was hit by 270-kilometre-per-hour (170 mph) winds and heavy rain, with many trees uprooted; the roadhouse owner, Janet Robb, described the property as looking like "an absolute warzone".

Pardoo also took the brunt of Cyclone Rusty in February 2013, recording 250 millimetres (10 in) of rain in 24 hours along with strong winds. Stock was killed from hypothermia and the homestead was damaged by the category four cyclone.

Ten years later in April 2023 Cyclone Ilsa passed directly over Pardoo as a Category 5 storm, causing over $4 million of damage to the nearby roadhouse, tearing roofs off buildings and overturning road trucks. Pardoo's new manager Scott Fraser had been there three weeks when Ilsa hit. Pardoo had 20 centre-pivot irrigation plants, used to grass feed the mainly Wagyu cattle. These were tied down ahead of the cyclone, but all but one was destroyed. Additionally, many station sheds and other buildings were destroyed. The financial loss was estimated at $25m.

== Climate ==
Climate data for Pardoo Station, Western Australia (1993–2020 norms, extremes 1993–present)
Month	Jan	Feb	Mar	Apr	May	Jun	Jul	Aug	Sep	Oct	Nov	Dec	Year
Record high °C (°F)	46.5 (115.7)	44.9 (112.8)	45.6 (114.1)	42.7 (108.9)	38.5 (101.3)	35.2 (95.4)	34.9 (94.8)	38.3 (100.9)	41.6 (106.9)	46.7 (116.1)	45.6 (114.1)	48.0 (118.4)	48.0 (118.4)
Mean daily maximum °C (°F)	36.2 (97.2)	36.0 (96.8)	36.6 (97.9)	35.7 (96.3)	31.9 (89.4)	28.4 (83.1)	28.3 (82.9)	30.2 (86.4)	33.3 (91.9)	36.1 (97.0)	36.9 (98.4)	36.9 (98.4)	33.9 (93.0)
Mean daily minimum °C (°F)	25.8 (78.4)	25.6 (78.1)	24.7 (76.5)	21.6 (70.9)	17.1 (62.8)	14.7 (58.5)	13.1 (55.6)	13.4 (56.1)	15.8 (60.4)	19.8 (67.6)	22.2 (72.0)	24.7 (76.5)	19.9 (67.8)
Record low °C (°F)	20.0 (68.0)	19.0 (66.2)	16.5 (61.7)	13.1 (55.6)	9.0 (48.2)	5.8 (42.4)	4.5 (40.1)	5.0 (41.0)	6.8 (44.2)	12.0 (53.6)	14.0 (57.2)	17.5 (63.5)	4.5 (40.1)
Average precipitation mm (inches)	92.7 (3.65)	112.7 (4.44)	84.1 (3.31)	18.5 (0.73)	16.2 (0.64)	20.6 (0.81)	13.3 (0.52)	6.0 (0.24)	2.2 (0.09)	1.3 (0.05)	1.3 (0.05)	37.9 (1.49)	407.9 (16.06)
Average rainy days	6.0	8.2	5.6	1.8	2.1	2.3	1.3	0.6	0.5	0.4	0.4	2.7	31.9
Average afternoon relative humidity (%)	60	63	55	43	40	41	38	35	39	46	45	54	47
Average dew point °C (°F)	23 (73)	23 (73)	21 (70)	17 (63)	11 (52)	9 (48)	7 (45)	7 (45)	11 (52)	15 (59)	17 (63)	21 (70)	15 (59)
Source 1: Bureau of Meteorology
Source 2: Time and Date (dew points) for Pardoo Airport (1985-2015)
