= Oakover River =

River in Western Australia

Coordinates: 20°43′46″S 120°40′33″E

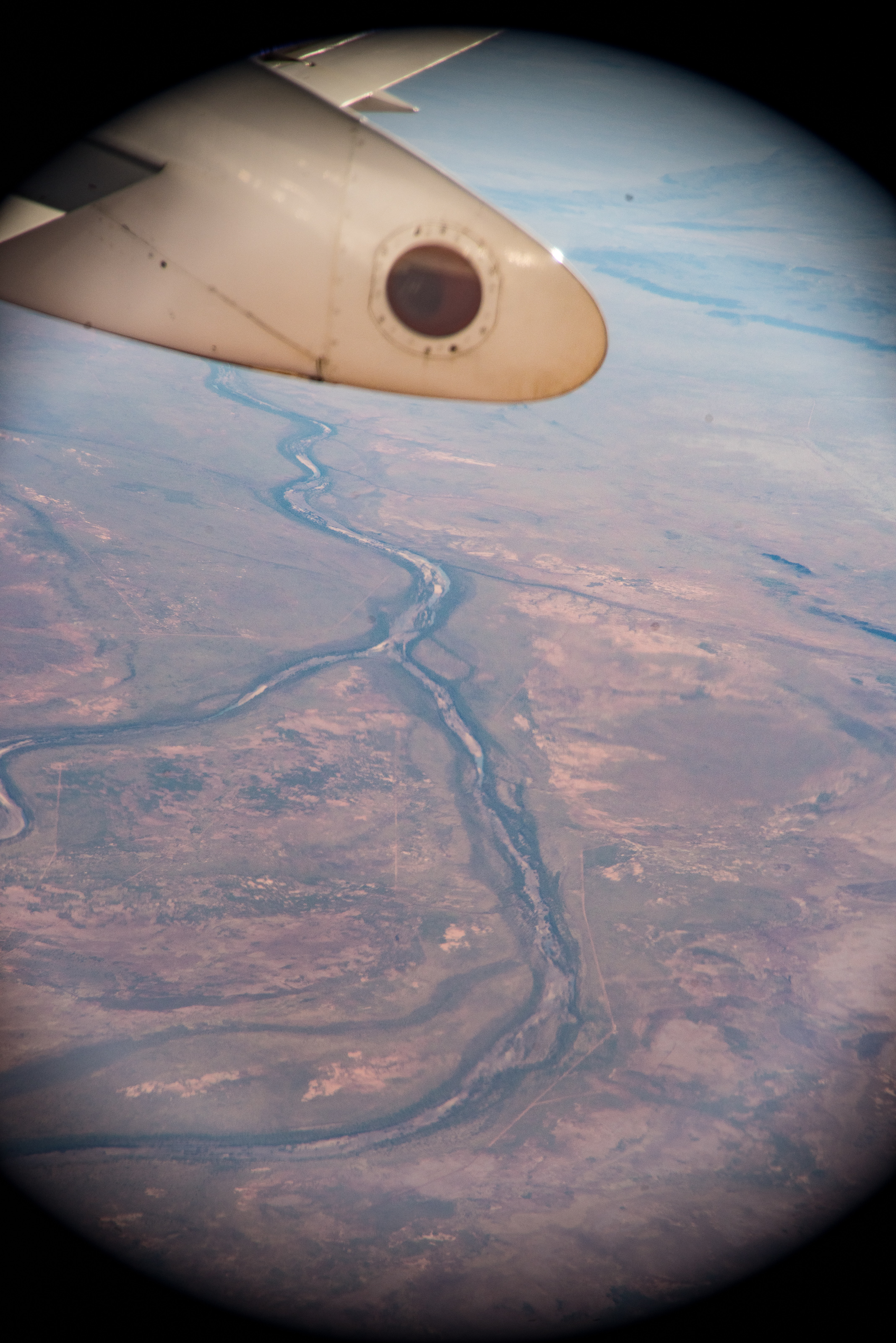

Location
- Country: Australia

Physical characteristics
- Source
  - location: Wadara Range
  - elevation: 437 metres (1,434 ft)
- Mouth
  - location: De Grey River
  - elevation: 126 metres (413 ft)
- Length: 376 km (234 mi)
- Basin size: 16,383 km^{2} (6,326 sq mi)

The Oakover River is a river in the Pilbara region of Western Australia.

The headwaters of the river rise north of the Wadara Range and west of the Saltbush range near Junction Well then flows in a northerly direction. The river continues north running parallel to the Gregory Range until merging with the Nullagine River to form the De Grey River.

The river flows through many permanent pools on its journey, including Toocoonaragee Pool, Carawine Pool, Yilgalong Pool and Ngumberramooring Pool.

There are 22 tributaries of the river, including Davis River, Stag Arrow Creek, Woodie Woodie Creek, Vanadium Creek, Yownama Creek and Yilgalong Creek.

The first European explorer to find the Oakover was Francis Thomas Gregory. Fellow explorer Peter Warburton crossed the river strapped to a camel toward the end of his trek across the Great Sandy Desert in 1873.

The traditional owners of the area are the Njamal or Nyamal people.
