= List of homesteads in Western Australia: X–Z =

This list includes all homesteads in Western Australia with a gazetted name. It is complete with respect to the 1996 Gazetteer of Australia. Dubious names have been checked against the online 2004 data, and in all cases confirmed correct. However, if any homesteads have been gazetted or deleted since 1996, this list does not reflect these changes. Strictly speaking, Australian place names are gazetted in capital letters only; the names in this list have been converted to mixed case in accordance with normal capitalisation conventions.

Name	Location	Remarks
Xantippe	30°17′S 117°2′E	
Yacklin	32°6′S 117°17′E	
Yairabin	33°32′S 117°33′E	
Yakabindie	27°35′S 120°32′E	
Yakka Flats	33°23′S 119°47′E	
Yalardy	26°6′S 115°15′E	
Yalbalgo	25°11′S 114°41′E	
Yalbra Outcamp	25°35′S 116°15′E	
Yallalong	27°26′S 115°31′E	
Yallambee	33°27′S 117°43′E	
Yallambee	34°34′S 117°16′E	
Yallaroo	34°16′S 119°16′E	
Yalleen	21°41′S 116°23′E	
Yallembee	33°1′S 117°30′E	
Yalliawirra	31°40′S 116°6′E	
Yalobia Outstation	24°16′S 114°2′E	
Yamarna	28°10′S 123°40′E	
Yamma	33°41′S 115°26′E	
Yandal	27°34′S 121°9′E	
Yandavale	29°33′S 115°29′E	
Yandee	31°29′S 116°31′E	
Yandella	33°57′S 117°5′E	
Yandeyarra	21°17′S 118°24′E	
Yandi	27°46′S 114°48′E	
Yandil	26°22′S 119°49′E	
Yandina	33°24′S 118°46′E	
Yanga Vale	33°37′S 118°1′E	
Yangedine	32°2′S 116°52′E	
Yanget	28°41′S 114°52′E	
Yannagobberly	33°47′S 117°45′E	
Yannawah	33°59′S 117°6′E	
Yanrey	22°31′S 114°48′E	
Yansmeade	34°17′S 117°35′E	
Yaparra	31°22′S 115°54′E	
Yaraandoo	32°53′S 116°37′E	
Yaraandoo	34°51′S 118°8′E	
Yaralinga	34°51′S 117°54′E	
Yaralla	34°0′S 117°15′E	
Yaralla	34°30′S 117°52′E	
Yaramie	30°49′S 115°41′E	
Yardup	34°11′S 118°14′E	
Yargalain	31°10′S 116°14′E	
Yarimbah	29°28′S 115°23′E	
Yaringa	25°57′S 114°19′E	
Yarlarweelor	25°35′S 117°59′E	
Yarra	28°31′S 114°34′E	
Yarra Downs	34°26′S 118°29′E	
Yarrabee	33°32′S 116°52′E	
Yarrabee	34°21′S 117°9′E	
Yarrabee	34°19′S 118°25′E	
Yarrabin	33°27′S 116°35′E	
Yarrabin	33°47′S 117°22′E	
Yarrabin	33°33′S 117°33′E	
Yarrabin Downs	34°8′S 117°18′E	
Yarrabubba	27°8′S 118°47′E	
Yarragadee	29°5′S 115°24′E	
Yarrak	33°56′S 116°56′E	
Yarralah	29°38′S 116°8′E	
Yarralena	34°16′S 117°20′E	
Yarralong	29°47′S 115°39′E	
Yarraloola	21°34′S 115°53′E	
Yarramiyala	33°46′S 118°22′E	
Yarramony Springs	31°31′S 116°44′E	
Yarramunda	34°20′S 118°30′E	
Yarranbah	34°9′S 117°8′E	
Yarraville	32°10′S 116°0′E	
Yarrawee	34°2′S 118°12′E	
Yarrawina	34°5′S 117°25′E	
Yarrawolong	34°18′S 116°47′E	
Yarrawonga	31°22′S 116°8′E	
Yarrie	20°41′S 120°12′E	
Yaruna	29°41′S 116°3′E	
Yate Creek	33°58′S 118°28′E	
Yatelands	33°58′S 118°47′E	
Yatharagga	29°4′S 115°22′E	
Yathroo	30°47′S 115°42′E	
Yattalunga	28°47′S 114°56′E	
Yeagarup	34°34′S 115°48′E	
Yealeringa	32°31′S 117°36′E	
Yealing	33°46′S 117°52′E	
Yearling	32°17′S 116°44′E	
Yeeda	17°37′S 123°39′E	
Yeedalong	33°37′S 116°46′E	
Yeedawinya	33°48′S 117°29′E	
Yeelirrie	27°17′S 120°5′E	
Yeenyellup	33°55′S 117°1′E	
Yellwarrie Downs	33°49′S 117°51′E	
Yelma	26°32′S 121°41′E	
Yelturtoo	28°45′S 115°11′E	
Yelverton Downs	33°44′S 117°7′E	
Yenadine	31°55′S 116°41′E	
Yenmore	34°22′S 117°33′E	
Yere Yere	30°37′S 115°43′E	
Yerilla	29°28′S 121°49′E	
Yerritup Creek	33°43′S 121°6′E	
Ygoola	30°40′S 117°12′E	
Yielima Park	33°44′S 122°40′E	
Yilgerin Park	32°1′S 118°8′E	
Yillgiddie Outcamp	28°14′S 116°32′E	
Yindi	30°23′S 122°31′E	
Yinnetharra	24°39′S 116°10′E	
Yippee Downs	33°58′S 120°27′E	
Yirri West	34°30′S 117°55′E	
Yirringerie	33°16′S 116°39′E	
Yllhartado	33°28′S 119°40′E	
Yohnavi	32°30′S 116°59′E	
Yolgerup	33°56′S 117°5′E	
Yongala	34°6′S 118°56′E	
Yongarup	34°20′S 117°25′E	
Yongayanning	33°19′S 117°9′E	
Yongerup	34°11′S 117°50′E	
Yoolburra	33°47′S 119°21′E	
Yoothapina	26°31′S 118°30′E	
Yorana	33°39′S 115°45′E	
Yorklands	34°30′S 118°35′E	
Youangarra	28°46′24″S 118°49′02″E	
Youanmi Downs	28°33′S 118°49′E	
Young River	33°46′S 121°10′E	
Younimup	33°20′S 117°11′E	
Youno Downs	27°4′S 119°15′E	
Yourdamung	33°13′S 116°15′E	
Yowadda	33°37′S 121°42′E	
Yowangup	33°39′S 117°30′E	
Yoweragabbie	28°14′S 117°39′E	
Yowerdabbie	30°45′S 115°41′E	
Ytiniche	30°4′S 116°12′E	
Yuin	27°59′S 116°2′E	
Yuin Outcamp	27°57′S 116°13′E	
Yuinmery	28°34′S 119°1′E	
Yulijoogalup	33°40′S 115°25′E	
Yulika	34°6′S 115°13′E	
Yullambee	33°20′S 115°47′E	
Yundamindra	29°15′S 122°6′E	
Yundra Outcamp	25°44′S 116°55′E	
Yungup	34°51′S 117°55′E	
Yuwarana	29°20′S 115°20′E	
Zeehan	33°36′S 121°53′E	

== See also ==
- List of pastoral leases in Western Australia
