= De Grey River =

River in Western Australia

Coordinates: 20°40′S 119°30′E

De Grey

Location
- Country: Australia

Physical characteristics
- Source
  - location: confluence of Nullagine River and Oakover River
  - elevation: 129 metres (423 ft)
- Mouth
  - location: Breaker Inlet, Indian Ocean
  - elevation: sea level
- Length: 193 km (120 mi)
- Basin size: 56,720 km^{2} (21,900 sq mi)
- Discharge
  - average: July av 3.9 GL/a (0.12 m^{3}/s; 4.4 cu ft/s)

The De Grey River is a river located in the Pilbara region of Western Australia. It was named on 16 August 1861 by the explorer and surveyor Francis Gregory after Thomas de Grey, 2nd Earl de Grey, who was at the time the president of the Royal Geographical Society.

The river rises south of Callawa at the confluence of the Oakover and the Nullagine rivers and flows in a west-north-westerly direction eventually discharging into the Indian Ocean via Breaker Inlet about 80 km north-east of Port Hedland.

Its stream bed is 100 to 130 metres wide, dry throughout most of the year. The shore's land is rich in grass and fertile, featuring trees.

The river flows through many semi-permanent pools of water on the way to the coast, including Yukerakine Pool, Muccanoo Pool, Talyirina Pool, Wardoomoondener Pool and Triangle Pool.

The river has eleven tributaries, including the Oakover River, Nullagine River, Coongan River, East Strelley River, Shaw River, Miningarra Creek, Egg Creek and Kookenyia Creek.

== See also ==
- Electoral district of De Grey
- De Grey Station
