= 1984–85 Australian region cyclone season =

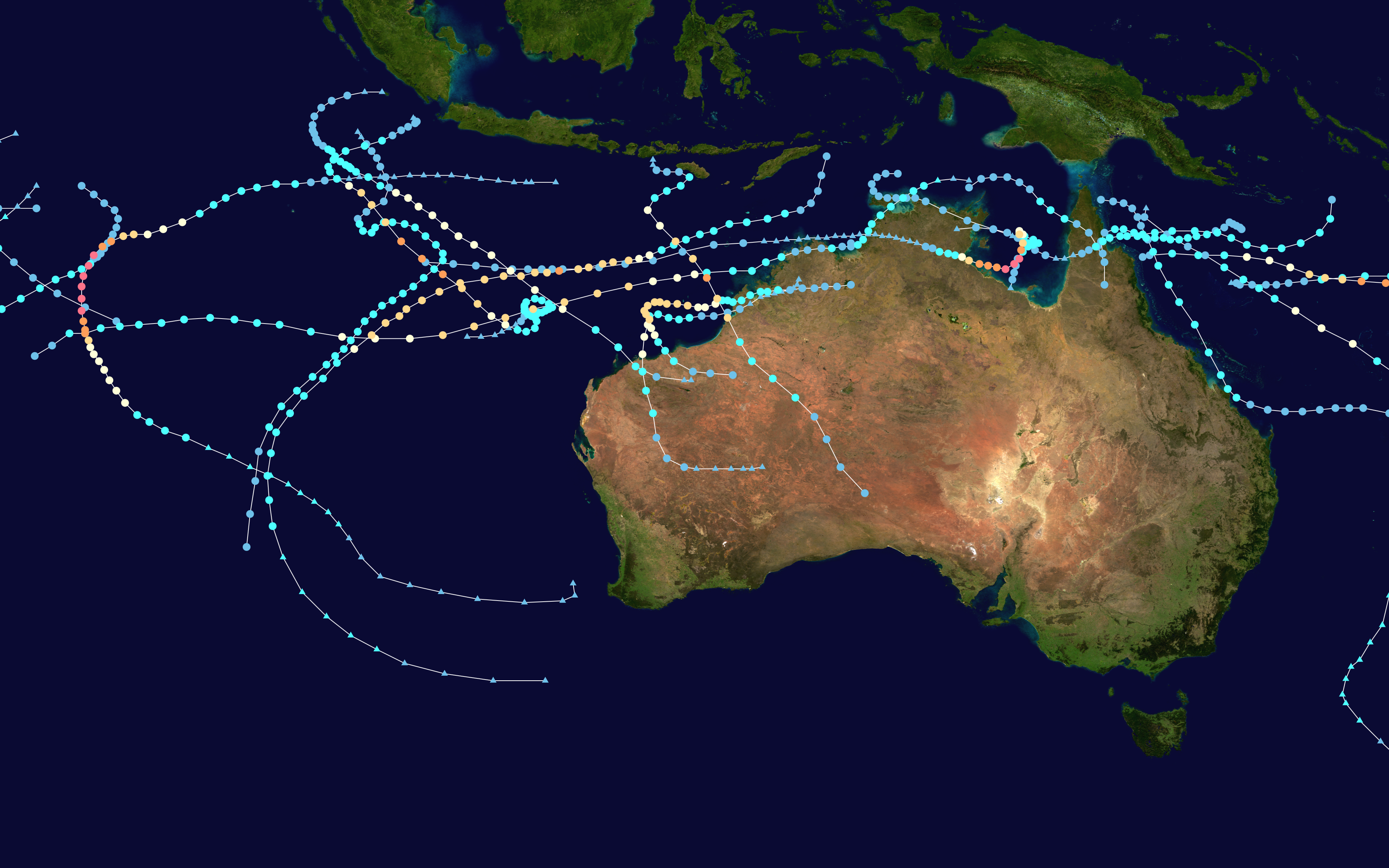
- Season summary map

Seasonal boundaries
- First system formed: 3 December 1984
- Last system dissipated: 15 April 1985

Strongest storm
- Name: Kirsty
  - Maximum winds: 220 km/h (140 mph) (10-minute sustained)
  - Lowest pressure: 925 hPa (mbar)

Seasonal statistics
- Tropical lows: 20
- Tropical cyclones: 18
- Severe tropical cyclones: 10
- Total fatalities: >25
- Total damage: $43.5 million (1985 USD)

Related articles
- 1984–85 South-West Indian Ocean cyclone season; 1984–85 South Pacific cyclone season

The 1984–85 Australian region cyclone season was one of the most active seasons on record. It officially started on 1 November 1984, and officially ended on 30 April 1985.

== Systems ==
=== Severe Tropical Cyclone Emma ===
- Category 3 severe tropical cyclone (Australian scale)
- Category 1 tropical cyclone (SSHWS)
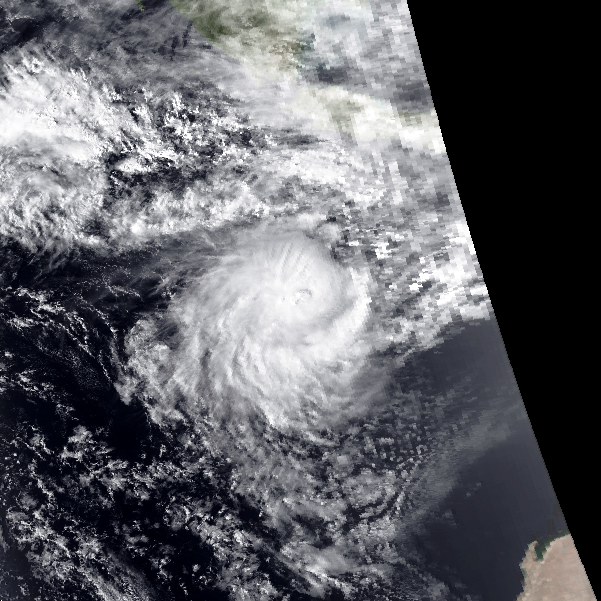
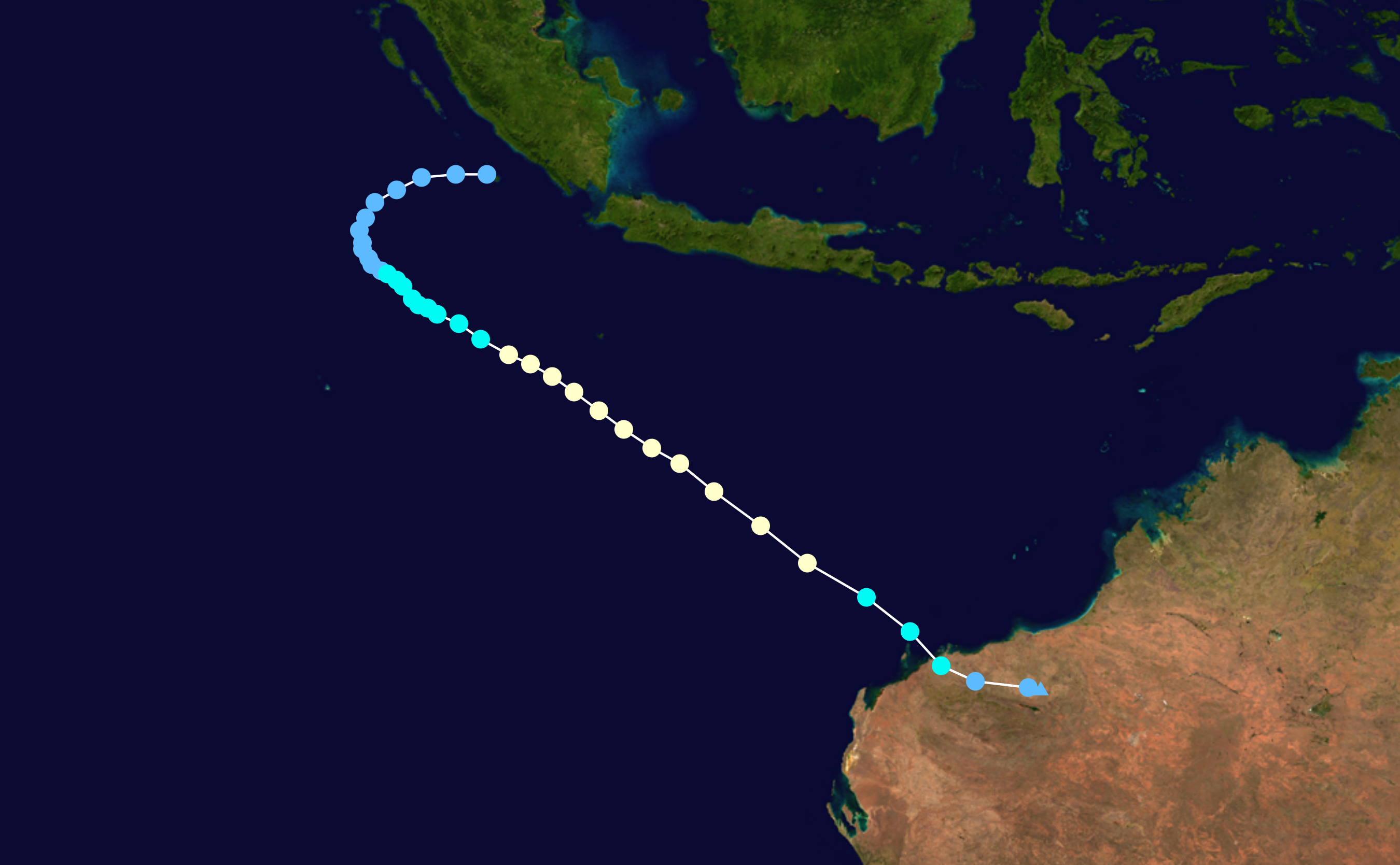
- Duration: 3 December – 13 December
- Peak intensity: 120 km/h (75 mph) (10-min); 967 hPa (mbar)

A Category 3 tropical cyclone, Emma struck Western Australia on 12 December 1984, as a Category 1 tropical cyclone.

=== Tropical Storm 04S ===
- Tropical storm (SSHWS)
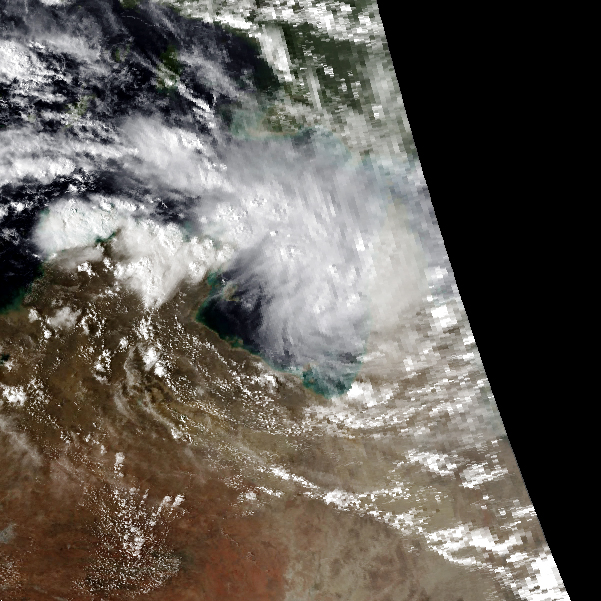
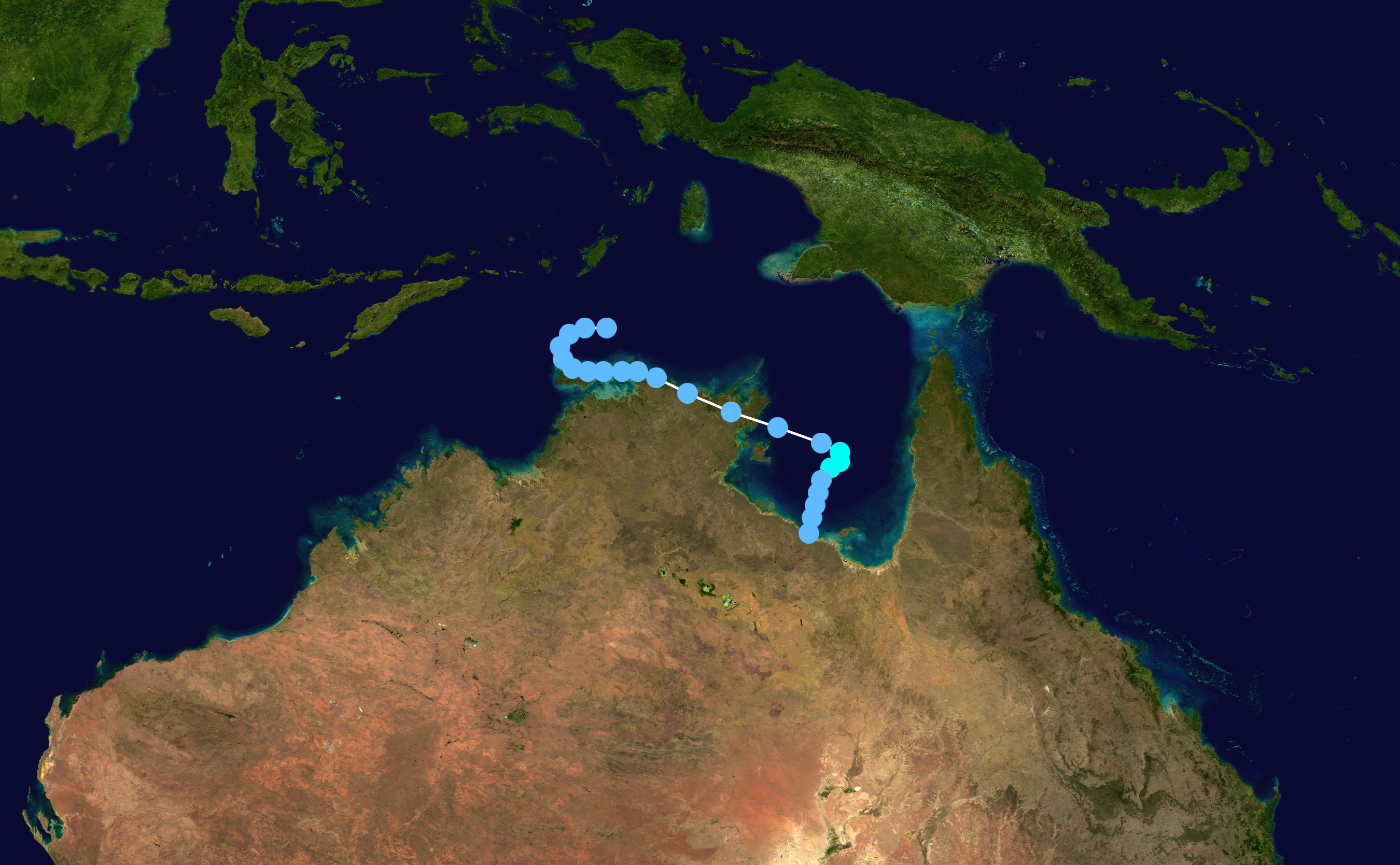
- Duration: 8 December – 13 December
- Peak intensity: 65 km/h (40 mph) (1-min); 996 hPa (mbar)

Due to its minimal intensity, 04S was designated only as a tropical storm strength cyclone by the Joint Typhoon Warning Center (JTWC). The storm remained unnamed by the warning center in Darwin.

=== Severe Tropical Cyclone Frank ===
- Category 3 severe tropical cyclone (Australian scale)
- Category 2 tropical cyclone (SSHWS)
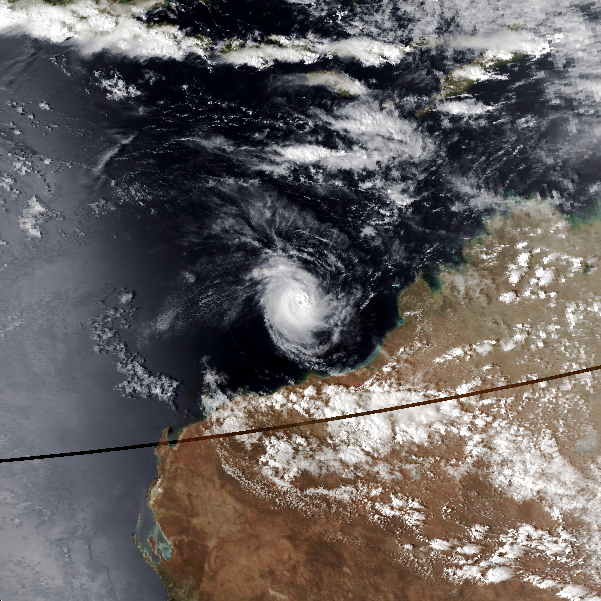
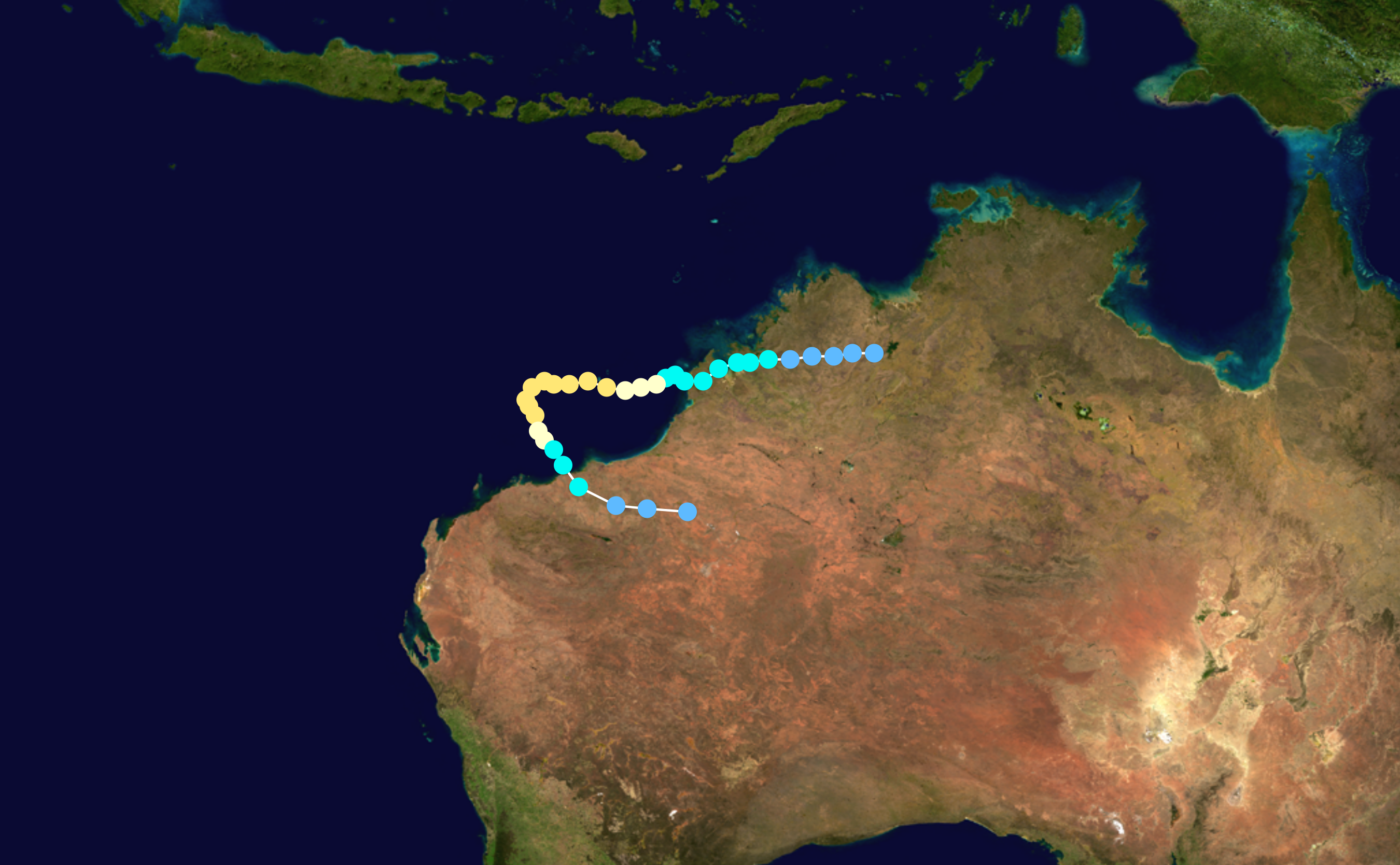
- Duration: 19 December – 28 December
- Peak intensity: 155 km/h (100 mph) (10-min); 950 hPa (mbar)

Tropical Cyclone Frank was a significant tropical cyclone which formed off the western coast of Australia. It peaked as a Category 1 storm on the Saffir–Simpson scale according to the JTWC. Perth assessed it as a category 3 on the Australian scale. After it turned to the south-east on 25 December, it made landfall as a Category 2 two days later near Port Hedland, Western Australia.

=== Tropical Cyclone Monica ===
- Category 2 tropical cyclone (Australian scale)
- Category 1 tropical cyclone (SSHWS)
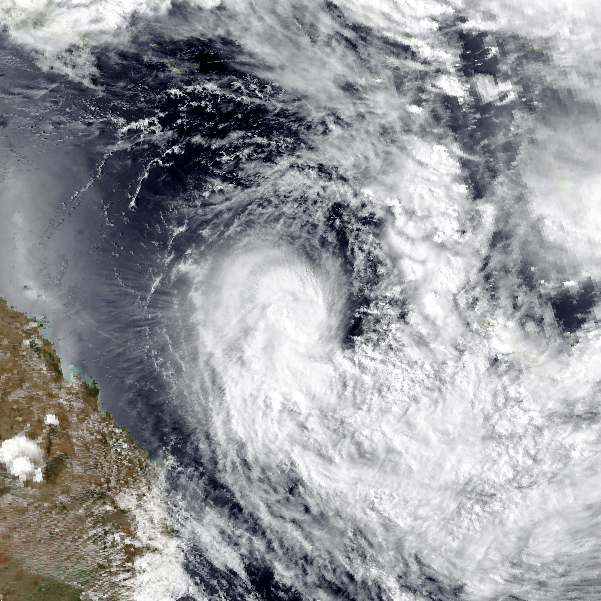
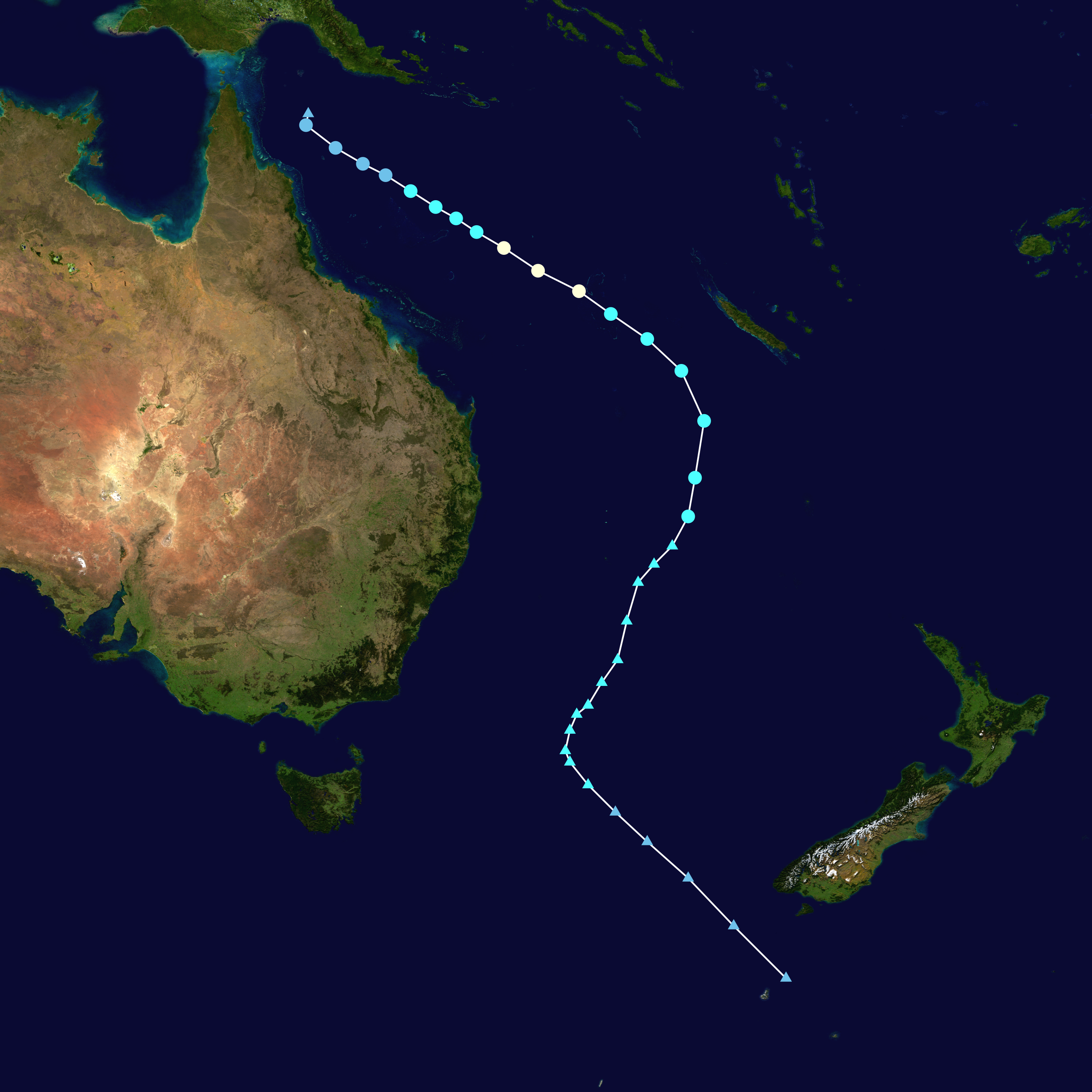
- Duration: 25 December – 28 December (Exited basin)
- Peak intensity: 100 km/h (65 mph) (10-min); 985 hPa (mbar)

Monica peaked as a category 2 storm, tracking roughly south-eastward, passing into the South Pacific basin on 28 December.

=== Tropical Cyclone Nigel ===
- Category 2 tropical cyclone (Australian scale)
- Tropical storm (SSHWS)
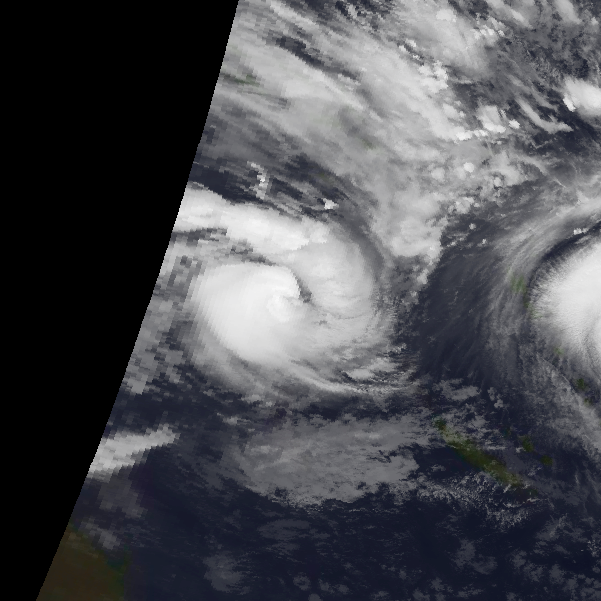
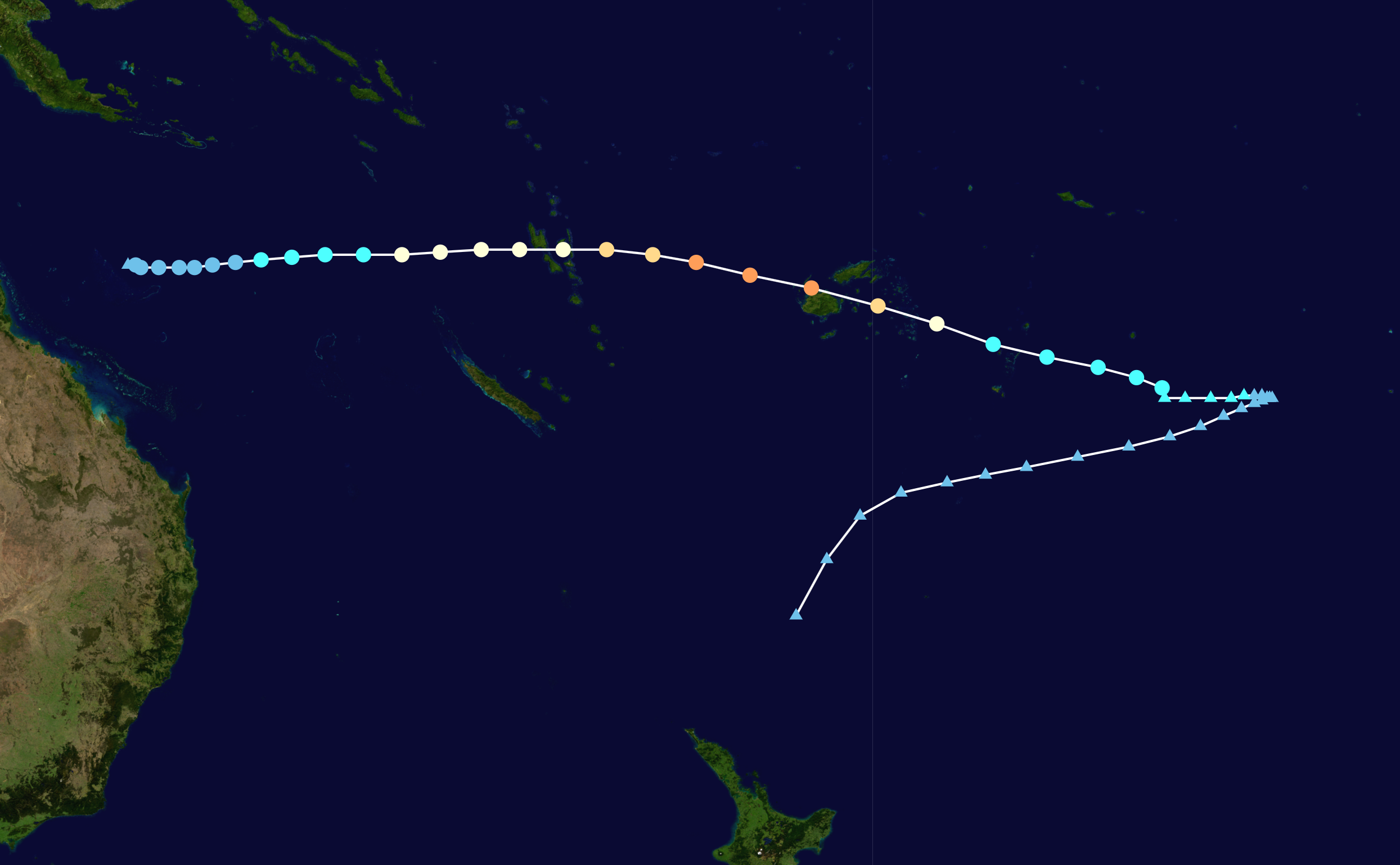
- Duration: 14 January – 16 January (Exited basin)
- Peak intensity: 110 km/h (70 mph) (10-min); 996 hPa (mbar)

During the middle of January, an ill-defined tropical low formed within the Intertropical Convergence Zone, near the Cape York Peninsula and moved eastwards into the Coral Sea. Over the next few days, the system moved eastwards into the Coral Sea, before its circulation became better defined during 14 January. The system continued to move eastwards over the next couple of days, before the JTWC initiated advisories on the system and designated it as Tropical Cyclone 13P on 16 January. Later that day, as the system approached 160°E and the South Pacific basin, TCWC Brisbane reported that the low had become a tropical cyclone and named it Nigel. The newly named system subsequently moved out of the Australian region later that day, with 10-minute sustained winds of 110 km/h (70 mph), which made it a Category 2 tropical cyclone on the Australian scale. Nigel caused no damage while located within the Australian region, however, the system later caused significant impacts to Fiji and Vanuatu.

=== Severe Tropical Cyclone Odette ===
- Category 4 severe tropical cyclone (Australian scale)
- Category 3 tropical cyclone (SSHWS)
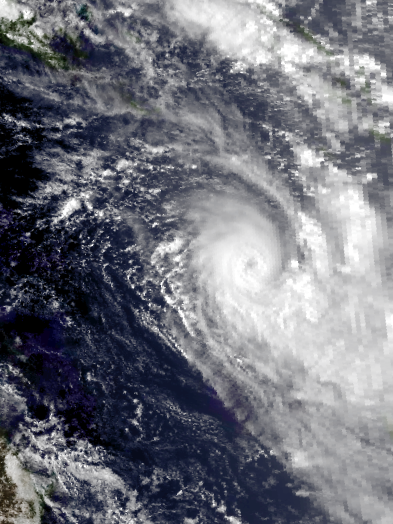
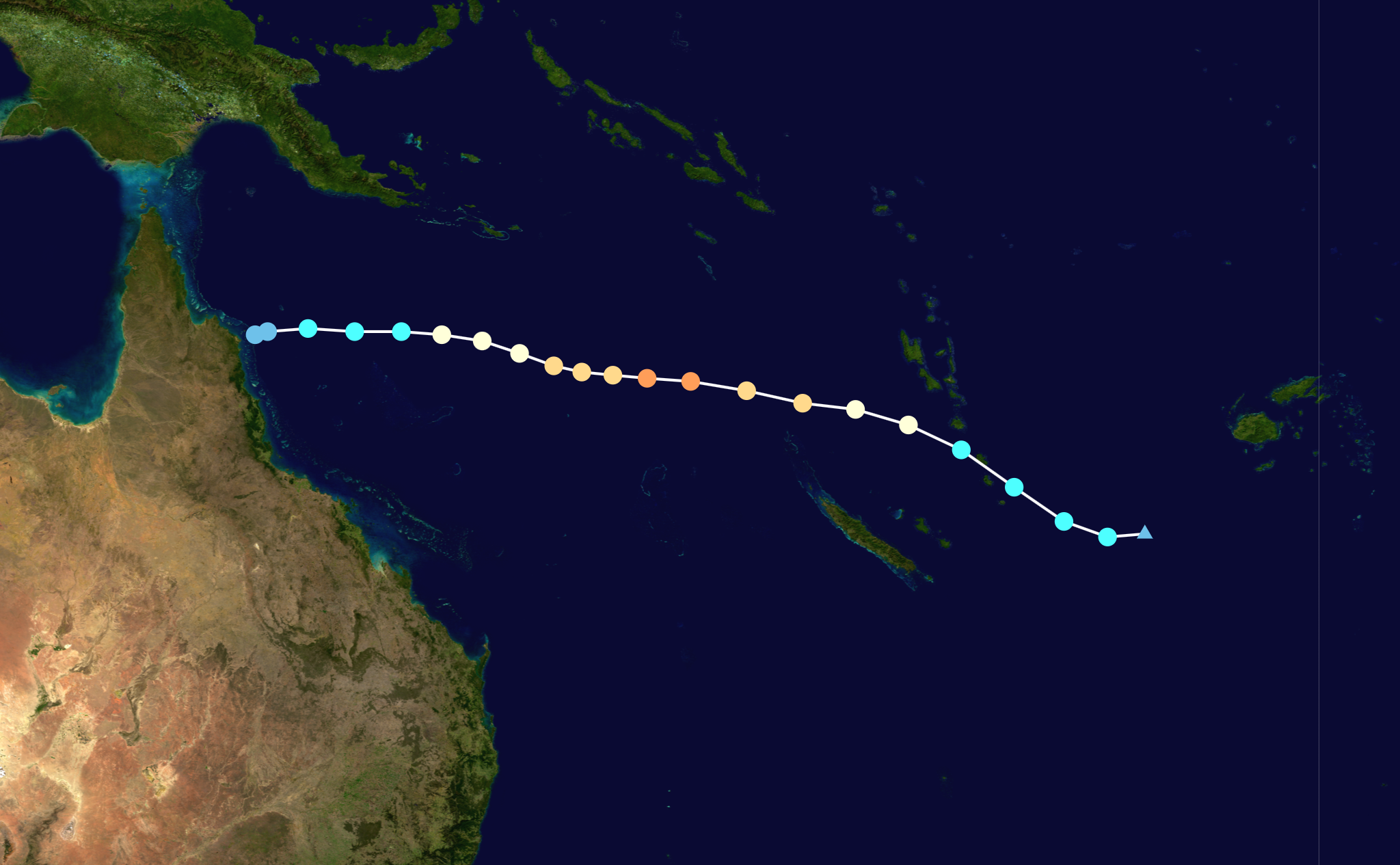
- Duration: 16 January – 19 January (Exited basin)
- Peak intensity: 185 km/h (115 mph) (10-min); 930 hPa (mbar)

Odette was a powerful cyclone. It lasted for 4 days.

=== Tropical Cyclone Gertie ===
- Category 2 tropical cyclone (Australian scale)
- Category 1 tropical cyclone (SSHWS)
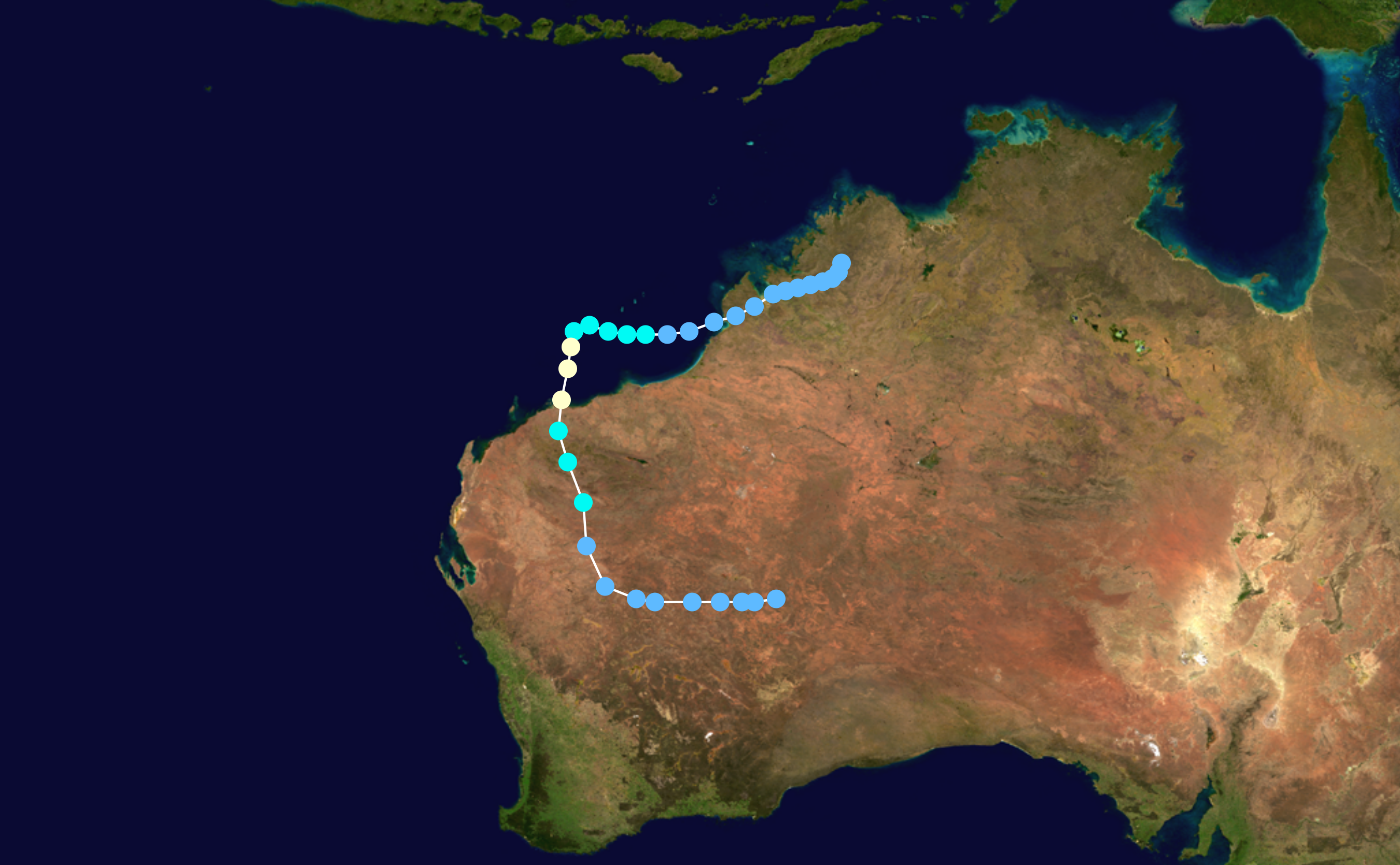
- Duration: 26 January – 3 February
- Peak intensity: 110 km/h (70 mph) (10-min); 973 hPa (mbar)

Gertie made landfall in Western Australia before dissipating.

=== Tropical Low 18P ===
- Tropical low (Australian scale)
- Tropical storm (SSHWS)
- Duration: 2 February – 6 February
- Peak intensity: 55 km/h (35 mph) (10-min); 996 hPa (mbar)

This system remained weak.

=== Severe Tropical Cyclone Hubert ===
- Category 3 severe tropical cyclone (Australian scale)
- Category 2 tropical cyclone (SSHWS)
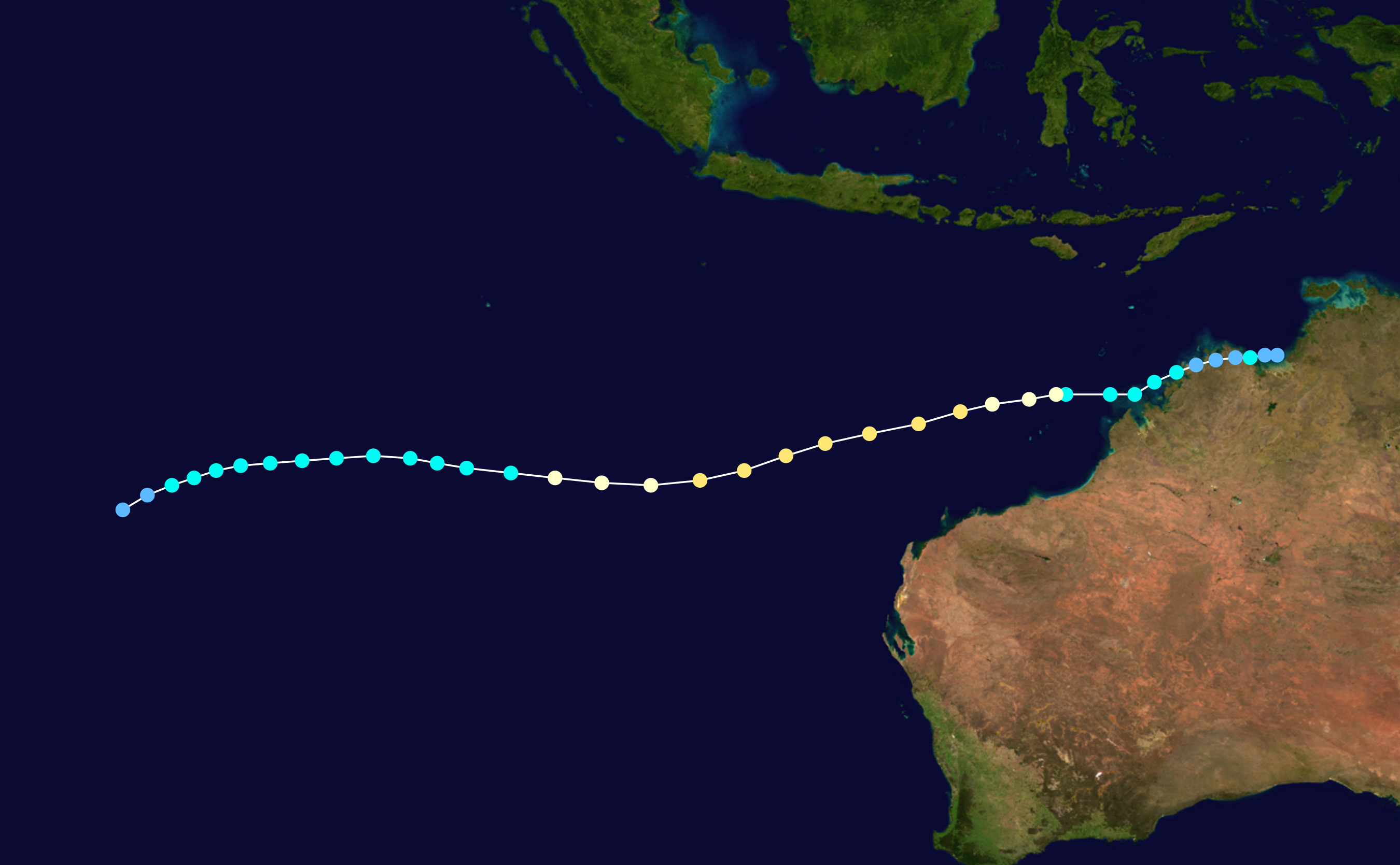
- Duration: 10 February – 19 February
- Peak intensity: 150 km/h (90 mph) (10-min); 954 hPa (mbar)

Hubert had major differences in peak intensity from BOM and JTWC, but did not touch land.

=== Severe Tropical Cyclone Isobel ===
- Category 3 severe tropical cyclone (Australian scale)
- Tropical storm (SSHWS)
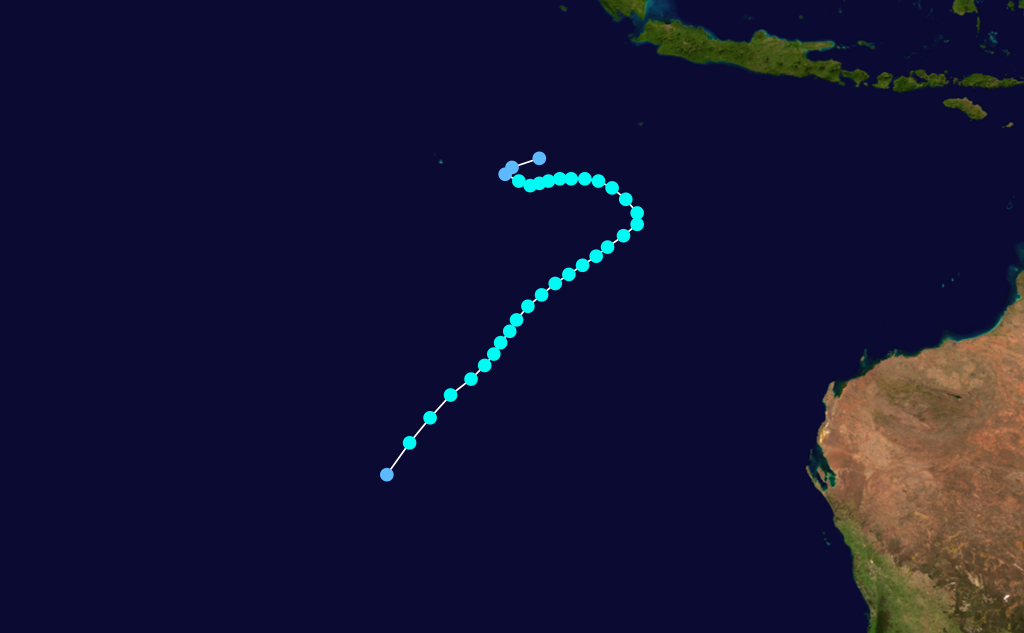
- Duration: 11 February – 22 February
- Peak intensity: 140 km/h (85 mph) (10-min); 960 hPa (mbar)

Isobel failed to affect land.

=== Severe Tropical Cyclone Jacob ===
- Category 3 severe tropical cyclone (Australian scale)
- Category 3 tropical cyclone (SSHWS)
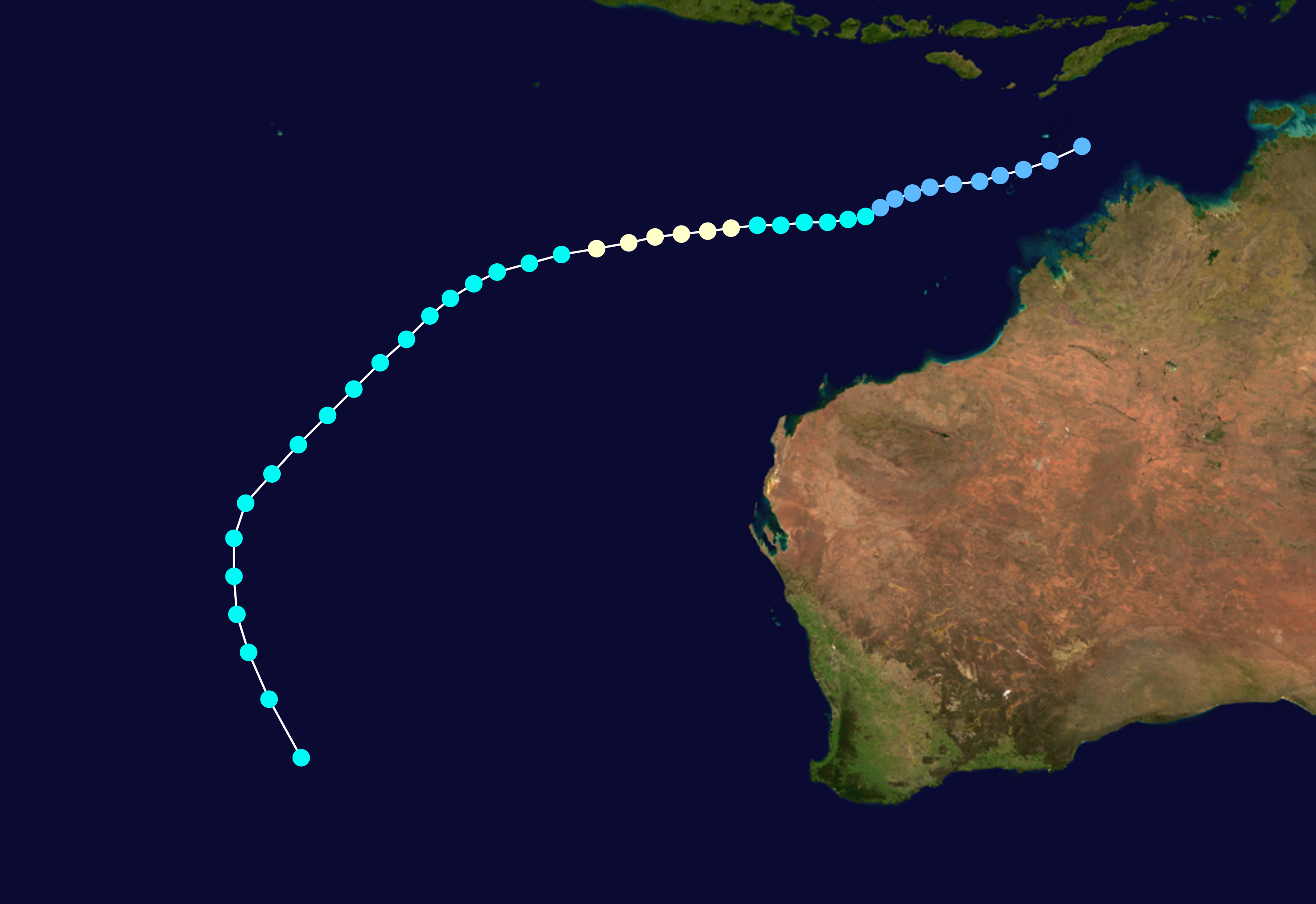
- Duration: 15 February – 28 February
- Peak intensity: 140 km/h (85 mph) (10-min); 950 hPa (mbar)

Jacob was a Category 3 system on the Australian scale.

=== Tropical Cyclone Pierre ===
- Category 2 tropical cyclone (Australian scale)
- Tropical storm (SSHWS)
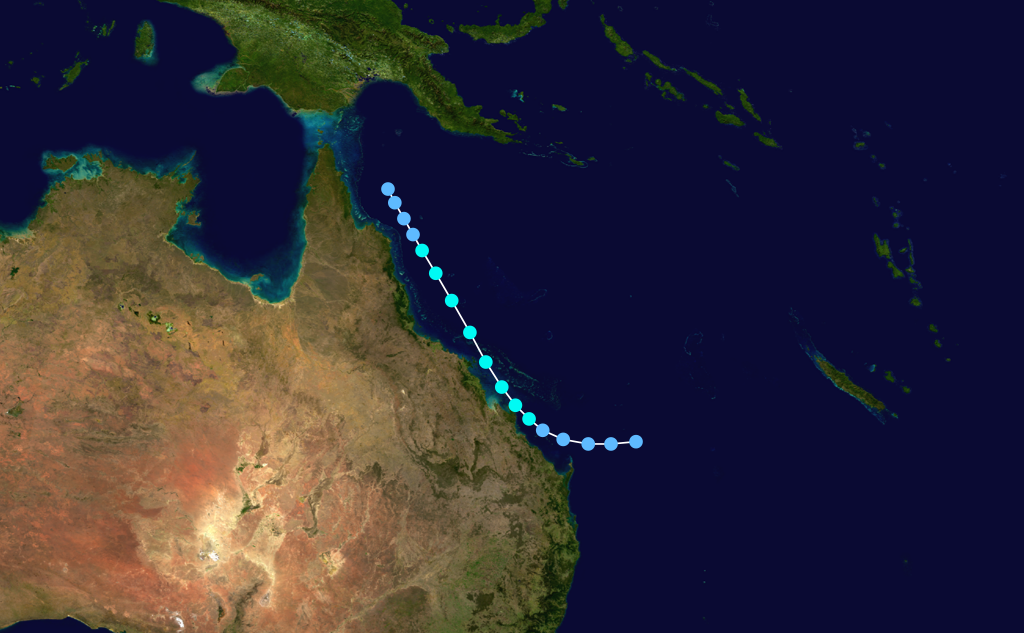
- Duration: 18 February – 24 February
- Peak intensity: 95 km/h (60 mph) (10-min); 986 hPa (mbar)

On 17 February the BoM reported that an ill-defined tropical low had developed within the intertropical convergence zone, near the tip of the Cape York Peninsula. The system became more defined over the next few days, as it moved out into the Coral Sea and slowly moved south-eastwards parallel to the Queensland coast. During 20 February TCWC Brisbane reported that the low had become a tropical cyclone and named it Pierre, while it was located about 160 km (100 mi) to the east of Cooktown. At around the same time, the JTWC initiated advisories and designated the system as Tropical Cyclone 26P, before they reported that Pierre had peaked as a tropical storm with 1-minute sustained winds of 85 km/h (50 mph) later that day.

The system subsequently accelerated south-eastwards, before the BoM reported that Pierre had peaked as a Category 2 tropical cyclone with 10-minute sustained winds of 95 km/h (60 mph) during 21 February. Later that day, the system made landfall in Shoalwater Bay and weakened below tropical cyclone intensity, before it moved back into the Coral Sea near Yeppoon. Pierre subsequently moved almost due eastwards, before it was last noted during 24 February as it moved out of the Australian region and into the South Pacific basin. As Pierre moved south-eastwards parallel to the Queensland coast, it produced high seas, gale-force winds, minor flooding and minimal damage.

=== Tropical Cyclone Rebecca ===
- Category 1 tropical cyclone (Australian scale)
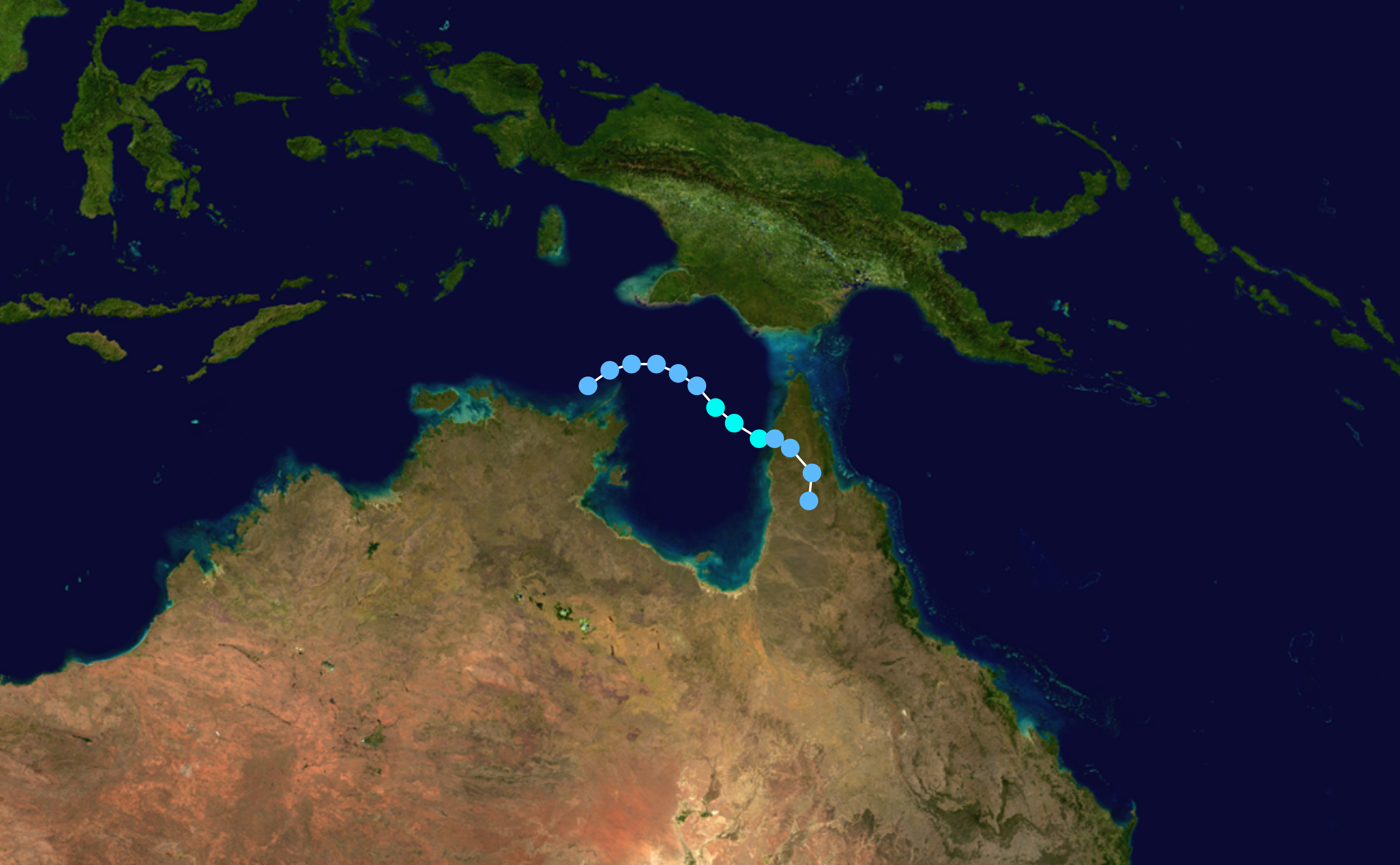
- Duration: 20 February – 23 February
- Peak intensity: 75 km/h (45 mph) (10-min); 994 hPa (mbar)

During the middle of February, a cloud mass persisted for several days in the Arafura sea, to the north of the Arnhem Land in northern Australia. During 20 February the BoM reported that the cloud mass had developed a surface circulation and classified it as a tropical low, while it was located around 750 km (465 mi) to the north of Galiwin'ku. During that day the system gradually intensified as it moved north-eastwards, before it gradually started to move south-eastwards and entered the Gulf of Carpentaria. During 21 February, the low continued to move south-eastwards and gradually intensify as it moved south-eastwards through the Gulf of Carpentaria, before TCWC Brisbane reported that it had become a tropical cyclone and named it Rebecca.

The newly named system peaked during 22 February as a category 1 tropical cyclone on the Australian scale, with 10-minute sustained winds of 75 km/h (45 mph). Later that day, Rebecca made landfall on the west coast of Cape York Peninsula just to the north of Weipa and weakened into a tropical low, before it dissipated during 23 February about 300 km (185 mi) to the west of Cairns. The initial tropical low produced a moderate amount of rainfall over the Arnhem Land, with a 24-hour rainfall total of 129 mm (5.1 in) reported at Warruwi on 19 February. There was no significant damage associated with Rebecca in the Northern Territory, while some damage to trees was reported in Weipa.

=== Severe Tropical Cyclone Kirsty ===
- Category 5 severe tropical cyclone (Australian scale)
- Category 4 tropical cyclone (SSHWS)
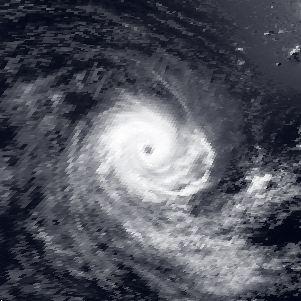
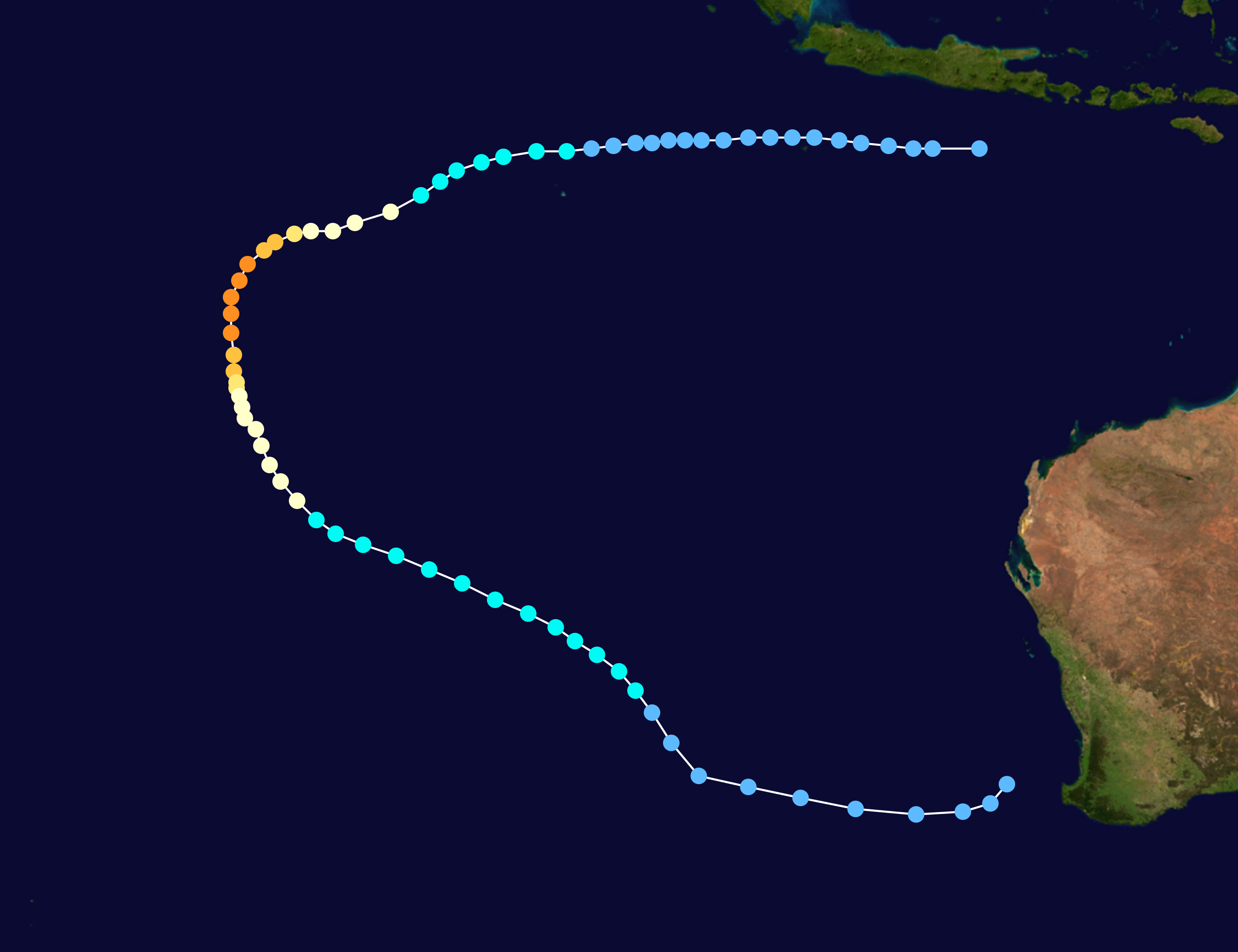
- Duration: 1 March – 7 March
- Peak intensity: 220 km/h (140 mph) (10-min); 920 hPa (mbar)

Although powerful, Kirsty failed to make landfall.

=== Severe Tropical Cyclone Lindsay ===
- Category 3 severe tropical cyclone (Australian scale)
- Category 3 tropical cyclone (SSHWS)
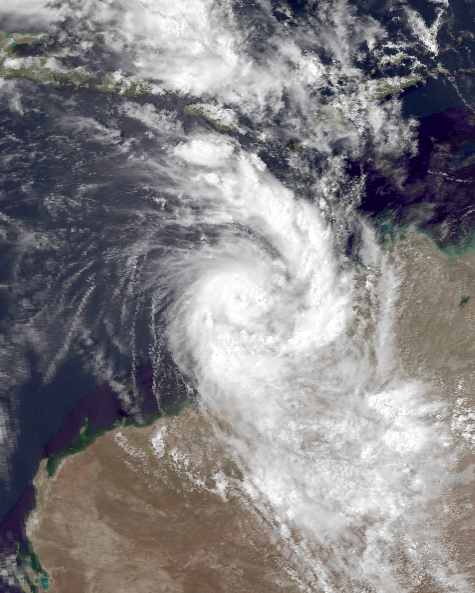
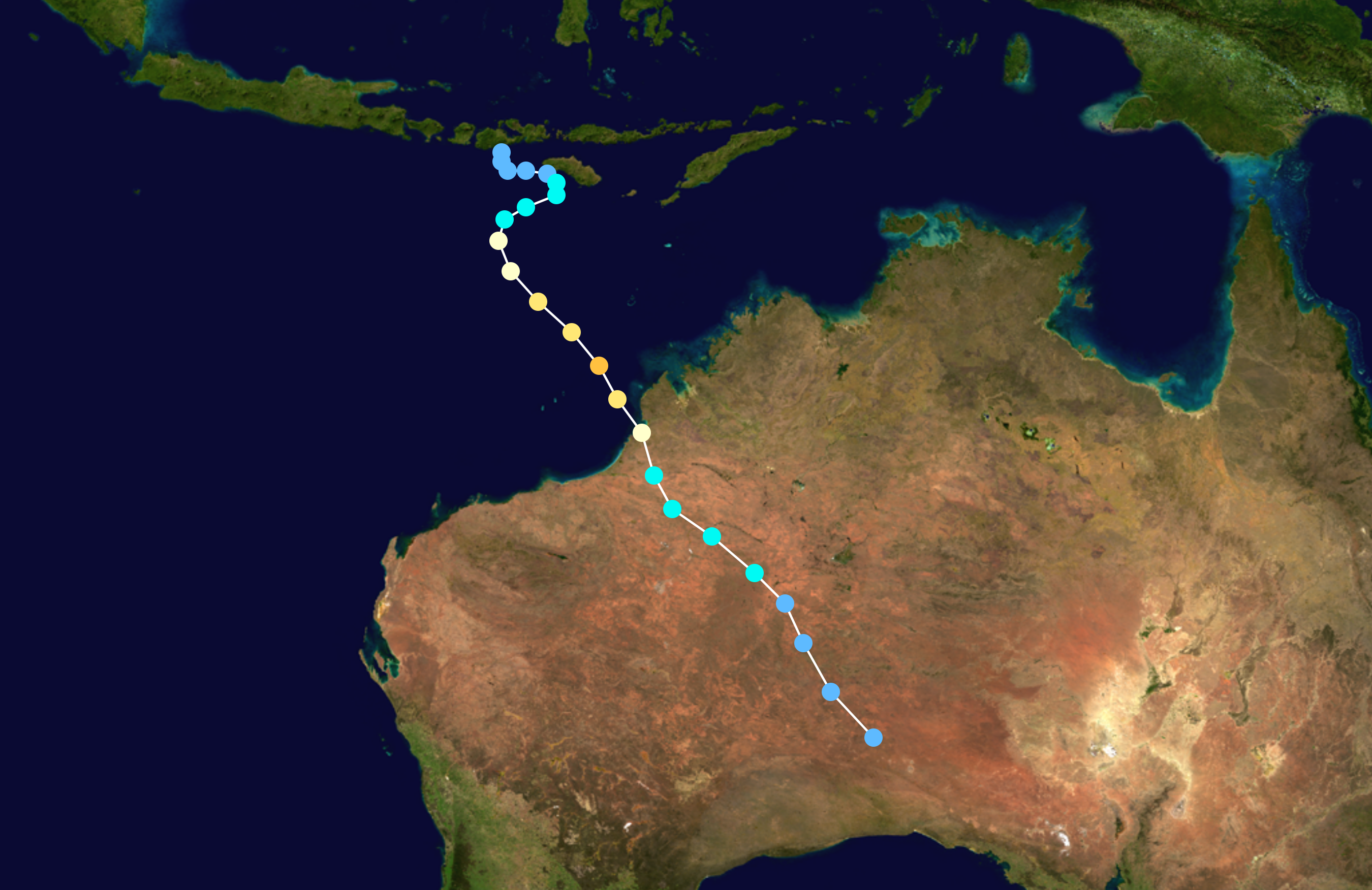
- Duration: 6 March – 11 March
- Peak intensity: 150 km/h (90 mph) (10-min); 950 hPa (mbar)

Cyclone Lindsay formed on 6 March 1985. The storm moved south-southeast reaching Category 3 status before making landfall near Broome, Western Australia.

=== Severe Tropical Cyclone Sandy ===
- Category 4 severe tropical cyclone (Australian scale)
- Category 4 tropical cyclone (SSHWS)
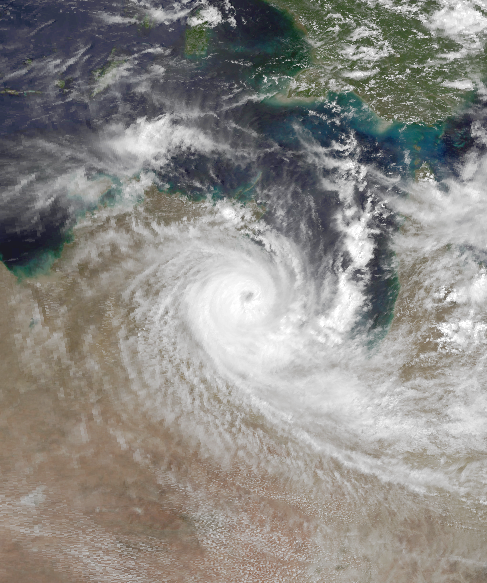
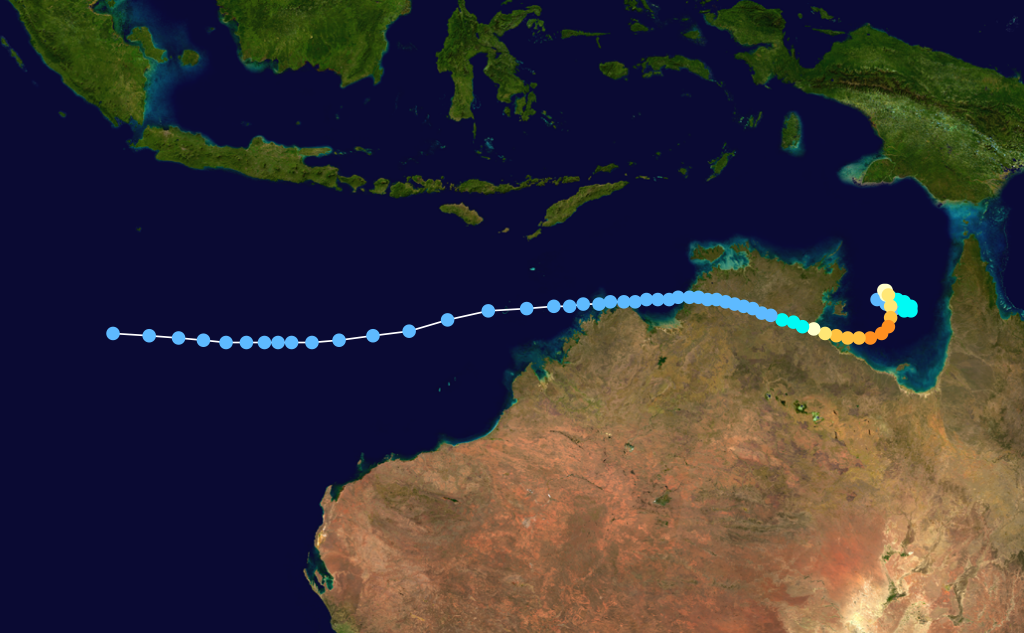
- Duration: 19 March – 3 April
- Peak intensity: 195 km/h (120 mph) (10-min); 953 hPa (mbar)

Sandy formed on 19 March in the Gulf of Carpentaria and strengthened rapidly into a Category 4 cyclone, before it made landfall near Sir Edward Pellew Group of Islands as a Category 2 cyclone on 24 March. Over the next days, Sandy moved into the Indian Ocean and dissipated on 3 April.

Similar to Cyclone Kathy, the storm was not as intense as Kathy. Two trawlers were devastated by Sandy, where swells of 12 m (39 ft) were measured. Storm surges were measured at 3 to 3.5 m (9.8 to 11.5 ft) at Centre Island. Flooding was extensive along the southern gulf coast. A total of 860 mm (35 in) of rain recorded in the island during a four-day time span.

=== Tropical Cyclone Tanya ===
- Category 2 tropical cyclone (Australian scale)
- Tropical storm (SSHWS)
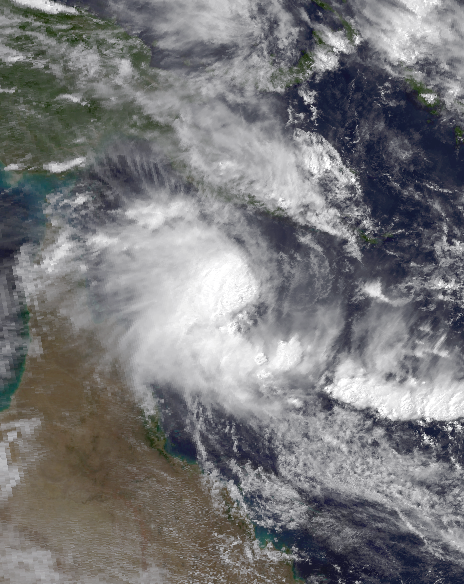
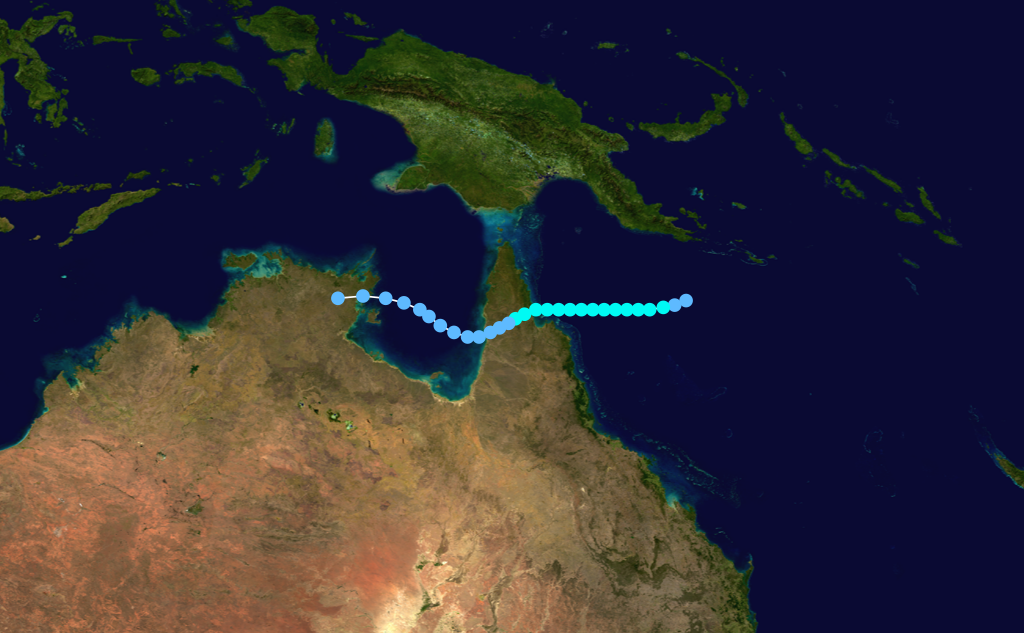
- Duration: 27 March – 1 April
- Peak intensity: 100 km/h (65 mph) (10-min); 982 hPa (mbar)

During 27 March, the BoM started to monitor a tropical low that had developed within the Intertropical Convergence Zone, about 700 km (435 mi) to the southeast of Port Moresby in Papua New Guinea. Over the next couple of days, the system moved westwards and gradually developed further, before the JTWC initiated advisories on the low and designated it as Tropical Cyclone 32P during 29 March. The BoM subsequently reported that the system had developed into a tropical cyclone and named it Tanya, as it continued to develop further and moved westwards towards the Cape York Peninsula. During 30 March, the BoM reported that Tanya had peaked with 10-minute sustained winds of 100 km/h (65 mph) and a minimum pressure of 982 hPa (29.00 inHg), which made it a category 2 tropical cyclone on the modern day Australian scale. At around the same time, the JTWC reported that the system had peaked with 1-minute sustained winds of 110 km/h (70 mph) and a minimum pressure of 979 hPa (28.91 inHg).

Tanya maintained its peak intensity for around 24 hours, before it started to weaken as it approached Cape York during 31 March. The system subsequently made landfall near Coen on the Cape York Peninsula, at around 14:00 AEST (0400 UTC) on 1 April and rapidly weakened below tropical cyclone intensity. Tanya's remnant tropical low was last noted by the BoM later that day as it moved towards the centre of Cape York. However, over the next couple of days, the JTWC continued to monitor Tanya's remnants as they moved across the Gulf of Carpentaria, before they made landfall and dissipated over the Arnhem Land during 4 April. Tanya caused some minor damage to vegetation, while there were no deaths or structural damage reported.

=== Severe Tropical Cyclone Margot ===
- Category 3 severe tropical cyclone (Australian scale)
- Category 3 tropical cyclone (SSHWS)
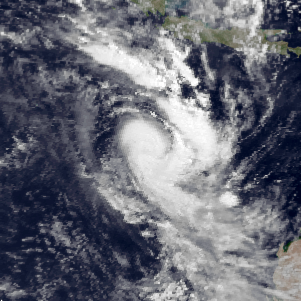
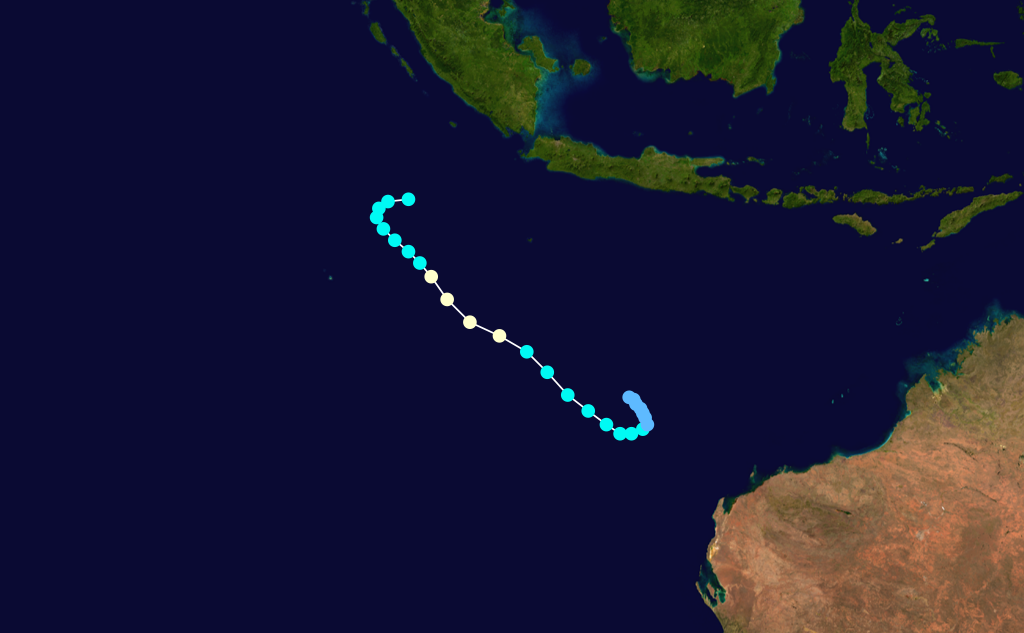
- Duration: 11 April – 21 April
- Peak intensity: 155 km/h (100 mph) (10-min); 942 hPa (mbar)

Cyclone Margot was a tropical cyclone that stayed out to sea during its entire duration. It was first identified on 10 April, off the coast of Sunda Strait. Margot then traveled to the southwest during 12 April, gradually intensifying to a tropical cyclone. In the noon hours of 13 April, it began to move to the southeast, under the influence of an intense high-pressure area to the south. The cyclone reached a peak intensity on 14 April, as a category three cyclone using the Australian scale, with winds of 155 km/h (95 mph). This intensity was based on satellite estimates, but the strongest report was from a ship eighteen hours earlier. After peak intensity Margot gradually weakened up until the 19, when it briefly underwent intensification, and turned west. This was short lived however, as dry, easterly low-level winds and wind shear began to influence the cyclone. Margot began to rapidly weaken and move in an easterly direction on 20 April. On the 21 Margot had become a remnant low after completing a figure-eight path. On the 25 the remnant low was absorbed by a broad low-pressure system located in the northeast Indian Ocean.

=== Tropical Cyclone Gretel ===
- Category 2 tropical cyclone (Australian scale)
- Tropical storm (SSHWS)
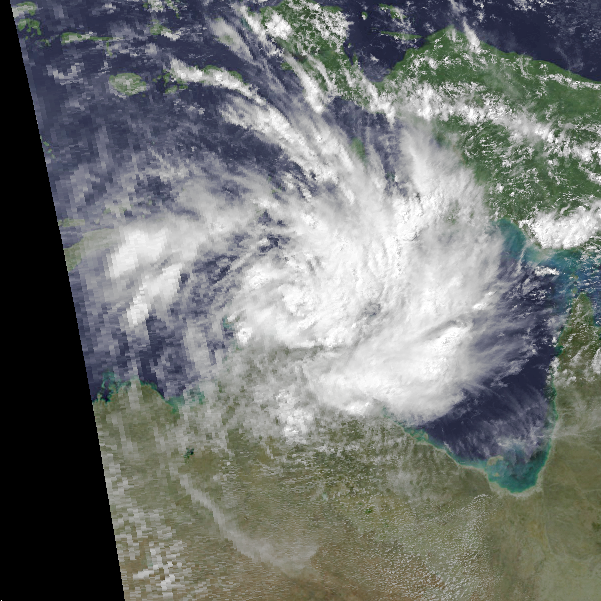
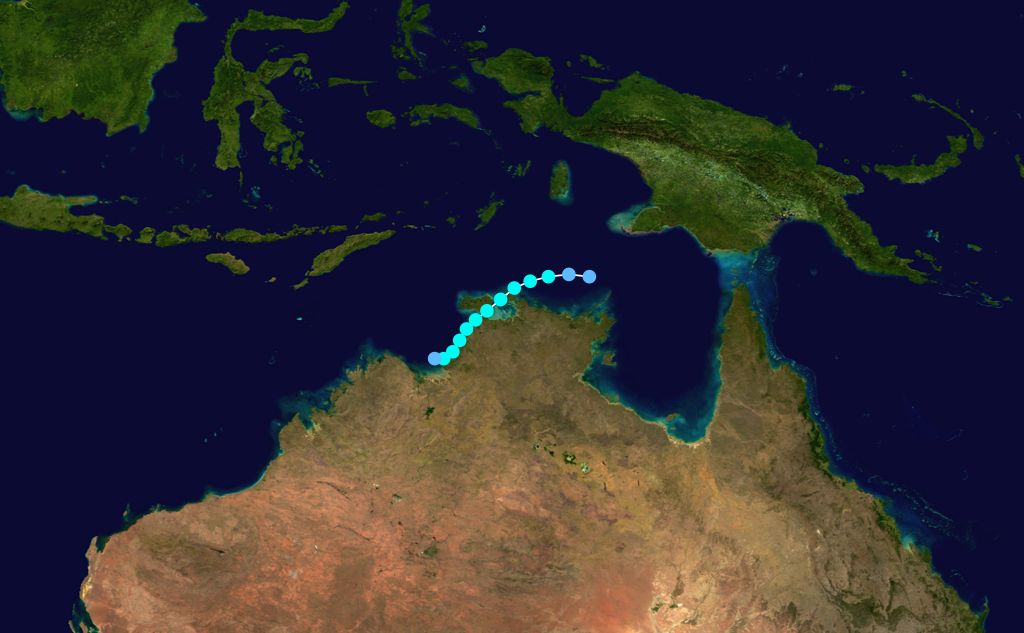
- Duration: 9 April – 14 April
- Peak intensity: 95 km/h (60 mph) (10-min); 984 hPa (mbar)

On 9 April, the BoM started to monitor a weak tropical low that had developed within the Gulf of Papua, to the west of Port Moresby in Papua New Guinea. Over the next couple of days, the system moved south-westwards through the Torres Strait and over the southern Arafura Sea, however, it remained poorly organised, which made it hard for the BoM to track the system and assess its intensity. During 11 April, the JTWC initiated advisories on the system and designated it as Tropical Cyclone 34S, before they reported that the system had peaked as a tropical storm with 1-minute sustained windspeeds of 85 km/h (50 mph). During the following day, TCWC Darwin reported that the system had become a tropical cyclone and named the system Gretel, after they had received various reports of gale-force winds from ships.

The newly named system subsequently passed over the Cobourg Peninsula into the Van Diemen Gulf, where it started to moved south-westwards and passed just to the north-west of Darwin at about 06:50 ACST on 13 April (21:20 UTC, 12 April). The BoM subsequently reported that Gretel had peaked as a category 2 tropical cyclone, with 10-minute sustained winds of 95 km/h (60 mph), after sustained winds of 84 km/h (52 mph) were recorded at Darwin Airport. Over the next couple of days, Gretel moved south-westwards parallel to the coastline of the Northern Territory, as upper-level windshear caused the systems low-level circulation centre to become displaced from the surrounding atmospheric convection. During 14 April the system weakened into a tropical low, while it was located near Port Keats, before it dissipated over the Northern Territory.

Overall Gretel had a minimal impact on Darwin and the Northern Territory, with damages estimated at AU$3 million, while no deaths were reported. The majority of the damage was caused by gale force winds uprooting hundreds of trees, which fell onto roads and power lines and caused power outages across the territory.

The system produced significant rainfall over the Northern Territory, with a rainfall total of 480 mm (18.9 in) recorded at the Nabarlek Uranium Mine.

Gretel produced significant rainfall over the Top End, with rainfall totals of 480–749 mm (18.9–29.5 in) recorded over the territory.

A large number of trees were brought down in Darwin, which fell onto power lines and caused power outages across the territory. It was later reported by the NT News that 95% of Darwin's overhead power connections were brought down by Gretel.

== Season effects ==
This table lists all the storms that developed in the Australian Region during the 1984–85 season. It includes their intensity on the Australian Tropical cyclone intensity scale, duration, name, areas affected, deaths, and damages.

| Name | Dates | Peak intensity | | | Areas affected | Damage (USD) | Deaths | Ref(s). |
| Name | Dates | Category | Wind speed | Pressure | Areas affected | Damage (USD) | Deaths | Ref(s). |
|---|---|---|---|---|---|---|---|---|
| Monica | 28 December – 3 January | Category 2 tropical cyclone | 110 km/h (70 mph) | 975 hPa (28.79 inHg) | New Caledonia | None | None | |
| Drena | 9–16 January | Category 1 tropical cyclone | 85 km/h (50 mph) | 987 hPa (29.15 inHg) | | | | |
| Nigel | 14 – 16 January 1985 | Category 2 tropical cyclone | 110 km/h (70 mph) | 996 hPa (29.41 inHg) | Queensland | None | None | |
| Odette | 19–21 January | Category 3 severe tropical cyclone | 165 km/h (105 mph) | 960 hPa (28.35 inHg) | Vanuatu | Minor | None | |
| Freda | 25–30 January | Category 3 severe tropical cyclone | 150 km/h (90 mph) | 955 hPa (28.20 inHg) | | | | |
| Pierre | 18 – 24 February 1985 | Category 2 tropical cyclone | 95 km/h (60 mph) | 986 hPa (29.12 inHg) | Queensland | Minimal | None | |
| Rebecca | 20 - 23 February 1985 | Category 1 tropical cyclone | 75 km/h (45 mph) | 994 hPa (29.35 inHg) | Arnhem Land, Cape York Peninsula | Minimal | Unknown | |
| Sandy | 20 – 24 March 1985 | Category 4 severe tropical cyclone | 195 km/h (120 mph) | 953 hPa (28.14 inHg) | Northern Territory, Western Australia | | None | |
| Tanya | 27 March – 4 April 1985 | Category 2 tropical cyclone | 100 km/h (65 mph) | 982 hPa (29.00 inHg) | Cape York Peninsula | Minimal | None | |
| Margot | 10 – 25 April 1985 | Category 3 severe tropical cyclone | 155 km/h (100 mph) | 942 hPa (27.82 inHg) | Western Australia | | None | |
| Gretel | 9 – 14 April 1985 | Category 2 tropical cyclone | 95 km/h (60 mph) | 984 hPa (29.06 inHg) | Northern Territory | | None | |
Season aggregates
| systems | 26 December – 25 April 1985 | | 220 km/h (140 mph) | 910 hPa (26.87 inHg) | | $40 million | 37 | |

== See also ==
- Atlantic tropical cyclone seasons: 1984, 1985,
- Eastern Pacific tropical cyclone seasons: 1984, 1985
- Western Pacific typhoon seasons: 1984, 1985
- North Indian Ocean cyclone seasons: 1984, 1985
