= Cyclone Alessia =

Category 1 Australian region tropical cyclone in 2013

Tropical Cyclone Alessia
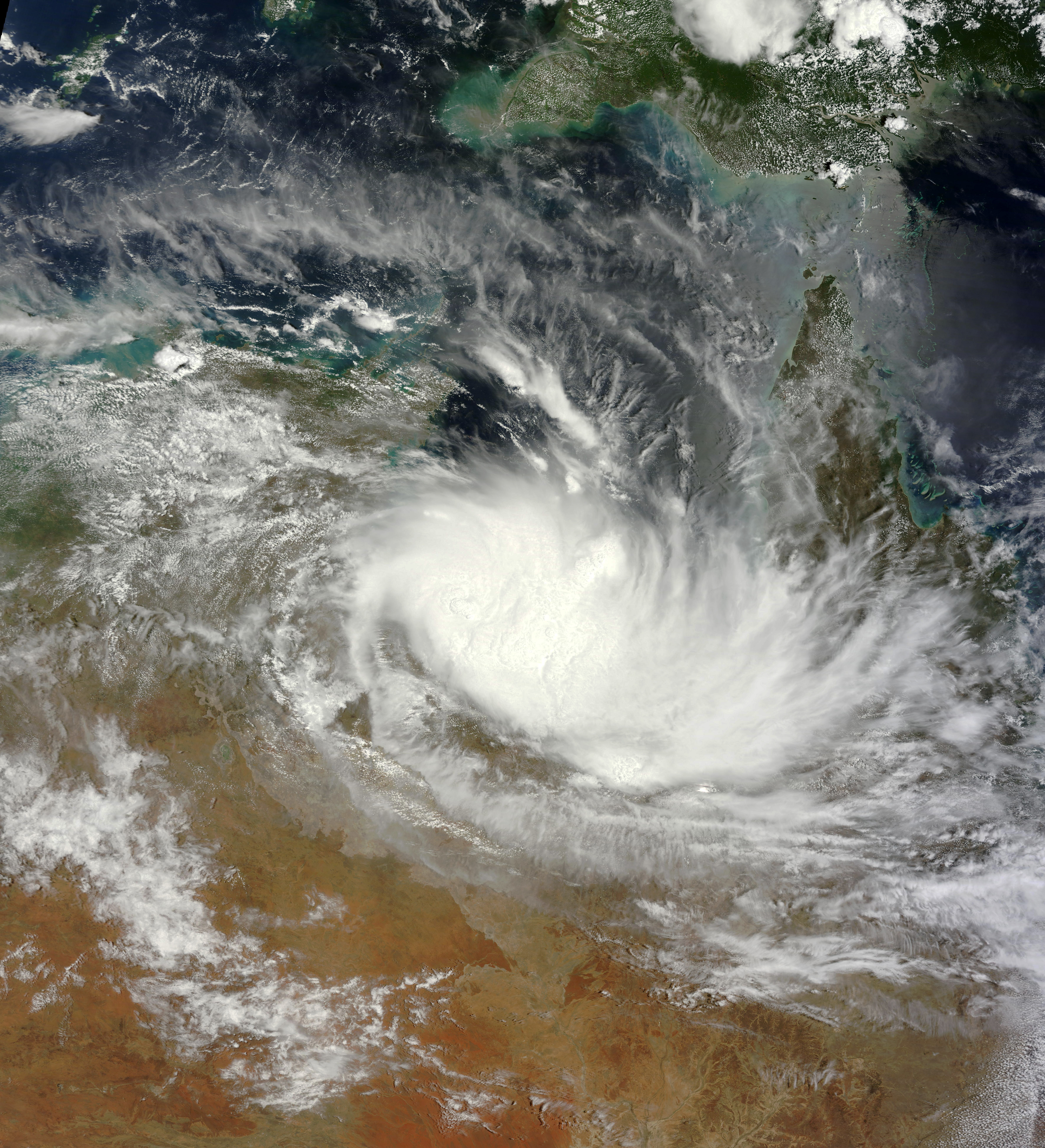
- Cyclone Alessia reorganizing over the Gulf of Carpentaria on 27 November

Meteorological history
- Formed: 20 November 2013
- Dissipated: 1 December 2013

Category 1 tropical cyclone
- 10-minute sustained (BOM)
- Highest winds: 85 km/h (50 mph)
- Highest gusts: 110 km/h (70 mph)
- Lowest pressure: 991 hPa (mbar); 29.26 inHg

Tropical storm
- 1-minute sustained (SSHWS/JTWC)
- Highest winds: 85 km/h (50 mph)
- Lowest pressure: 989 hPa (mbar); 29.21 inHg

Overall effects
- Fatalities: None
- Damage: Minimal
- Areas affected: Western Australia, Northern Territory, Queensland
- IBTrACS
- Part of the 2013–14 Australian region cyclone season

Tropical Cyclone Alessia was the first tropical cyclone to affect the Northern Territory of Australia in November since Cyclone Joan in 1975. The storm was first identified as a tropical low on 20 November 2013 well to the northwest of Australia. Tracking generally west to west-southwest, the small system steadily organized into a tropical cyclone by 22 November. (Note: In the Australian and South Pacific cyclones basins, a tropical cyclone is a storm that has sustained winds of at least 63 km/h (39 mph), equivalent to a tropical storm on the Saffir–Simpson hurricane wind scale.) Maintaining a small central dense overcast, Alessia brushed the Kimberley region before making landfall in the Top End region with winds of 65 km/h (40 mph) on 23 and 24 November respectively. (Note: All winds are in ten-minute sustained standards unless otherwise noted.) Some weakening took place as the system moved over land; however, reorganization occurred as it neared the Gulf of Carpentaria. After moving over water on 26 November, it redeveloped gale-force winds. Alessia reached its peak intensity on 27 November with winds of 85 km/h (53 mph) and a barometric pressure of 991 mbar (hPa; 29.26 inHg) and subsequently made its final landfall near Wollogorang. Weakening ensued once more as the storm traveled over land; though, Alessia's remnants looped eastward back over water before doubling back to the west. The system was last noted moving inland again over the Northern Territory on 1 December.

Throughout Alessia's existence, it caused only minimal damage. Several areas experienced gale-force winds, with gusts measured up to 109 km/h (68 mph) on Centre Island. Moderate to heavy rains accompanied the system as well, with a storm maxima of 290.4 mm (11.43 in) also occurring on Centre Island.

== Meteorological history ==
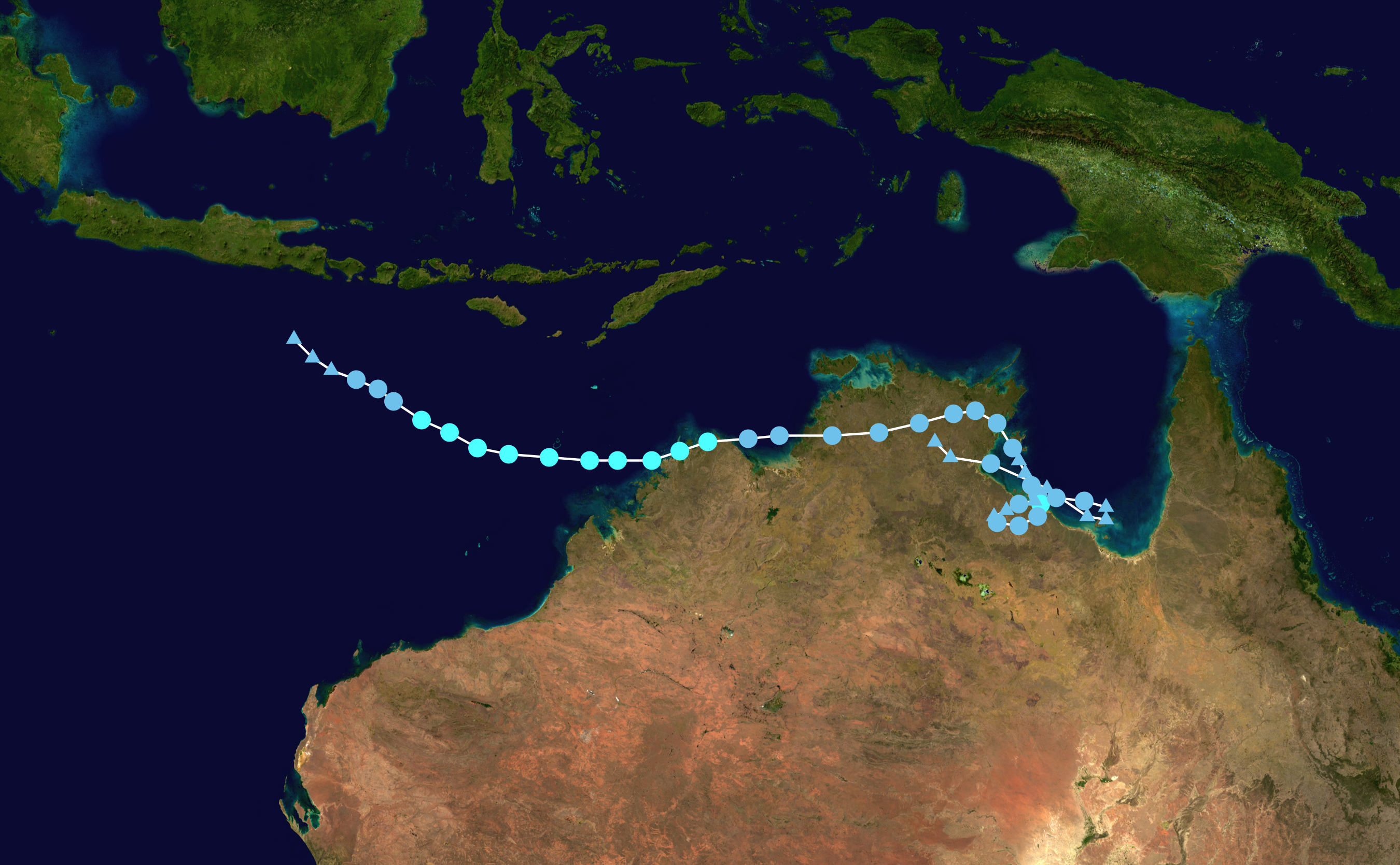
Map plotting the storm's track and intensity, according to the Saffir–Simpson scale Map key Saffir–Simpson scale Tropical depression (≤38 mph, ≤62 km/h) Tropical storm (39–73 mph, 63–118 km/h) Category 1 (74–95 mph, 119–153 km/h) Category 2 (96–110 mph, 154–177 km/h) Category 3 (111–129 mph, 178–208 km/h) Category 4 (130–156 mph, 209–251 km/h) Category 5 (≥157 mph, ≥252 km/h) Unknown Storm type Tropical cyclone Subtropical cyclone Extratropical cyclone, remnant low, tropical disturbance, or monsoon depression

On 20 November 2013, an area of low pressure, accompanied by persistent deep convection, developed over the southern Indian Ocean, roughly 1,465 km (910 mi) north of RAAF Learmonth in Western Australia. At the mid-levels, the circulation appeared more broad in nature, with notable rainbands wrapping into the low. Environmental conditions favored tropical cyclogenesis, with moderate wind shear, high sea surface temperatures, and prominent outflow that extended into the mid-latitude westerlies. By this time, the Bureau of Meteorology (BOM) noted this system as a tropical low just outside their area of responsibility. Owing to increasing organization over the following day, the Joint Typhoon Warning Center (JTWC) issued a Tropical Cyclone Formation Alert for the system late on 21 November. (Note: The Joint Typhoon Warning Center is a joint United States Navy – United States Air Force task force that issues tropical cyclone warnings for the western Pacific Ocean and other regions.) Subsequently, the JTWC began issuing advisories on the system under the identifier Tropical Cyclone 02S on 22 November, estimating it to have attained gale-force winds. Situated along the edge of a near-equatorial ridge, the storm tracked generally east and was forecast to maintain this movement for much of its existence. Later on 21 November, the BOM classified the system as a Category 1 tropical cyclone on the Australian cyclone intensity scale and assigned it the name Alessia, at which time it was located 390 km (240 mi) north of Broome. A smaller-than-average cyclone, Alessia featured a core of deep convection but no notable banding features, making Dvorak satellite intensity estimates difficult.

The storm, having a maximum diameter of no more than 335 km (208 mi) with gale-force winds covering less than half that distance, maintained a very small central dense overcast as it approached the Kimberley region. Around 0600 UTC on 23 November, the JTWC estimated Alessia to have attained one-minute sustained winds of 85 km/h (53 mph). Throughout 23 November, a slight northerly component took place in the track, with Alessia remaining offshore as it brushed the Kimberley region. However, dry air from over Australia was drawn into the system, causing a dramatic decrease in convection. At this time, Alessia became the first storm since Tropical Cyclone Anika in 2008 to affect Western Australia during November. Later that day, the storm passed over Troughton Island where gale-force winds were measured. Moving over the Joseph Bonaparte Gulf at the southern end of the Timor Sea early on 24 November, a burst in convection over Alessia's center indicated it was maintaining its intensity as a minimal tropical cyclone. Continued reorganization of the cyclone's structure took place as it accelerated east toward the Top End region, with defined banding apparent on satellite imagery and a tight circulation center seen on local radar. Alessia made landfall at 0930 UTC on 24 November near the Daly River mouth, south of Darwin, Northern Territory, before rapidly weakening to a tropical low. Alessia's movement onshore marked the first time since Cyclone Joan in 1975 that a tropical cyclone affected the Northern Territory during November. In light of the system moving overland, the JTWC issues their final advisory on the cyclone. Moving steadily eastward across Top End, Alessia remained weak but its proximity to water allowed significant bursts of convection to develop during this time.

Early on 26 November, the former cyclone emerged over the Gulf of Carpentaria near Blue Mud Bay. Once offshore, a break in the upper-level ridge previously steering the storm eastward caused a southward shift in the track, bringing it directly over Groote Eylandt for several hours. Gale-force winds soon redeveloped over the southeastern quadrant of Alessia; however, it was not re-designated as a tropical cyclone until 27 November when the winds extended halfway around the circulation. As Alessia re-intensified over the southwestern Gulf, its movement became more southeasterly, taking the circulation parallel to the coast. With an anticyclone over the Northern Territory providing modest outflow for the cyclone, it continued to intensify; the JTWC also re-initiated advisories on the storm by 0600 UTC on 27 November. Hours later, Alessia reached its peak strength with winds of 85 km/h (53 mph) and a barometric pressure estimated at 991 mbar (hPa; 29.27 inHg). Simultaneously, it moved ashore near Wollogorang, roughly 130 km (81 mi) east of Borroloola. Increasing shear and land interaction caused the low- and mid-level circulations to separate, with the later continuing eastward over water. The storm soon weakened to a tropical low and its movement became erratic. Its remnants persisted for several days in the same general region, executing a clockwise loop before moving back over the Gulf of Carpentaria on 28 November. While environmental conditions favored redevelopment once again and deep convection had formed over the system, its low-level circulation remained poorly organized. Failing to regenerate, Alessia moved eastward before doubling back to the west, passing near the Sir Edward Pellew Group of Islands on 30 November. It was last noted on 1 December over the Top End region.

== Preparations and impact ==
=== Kimberley and Top End ===
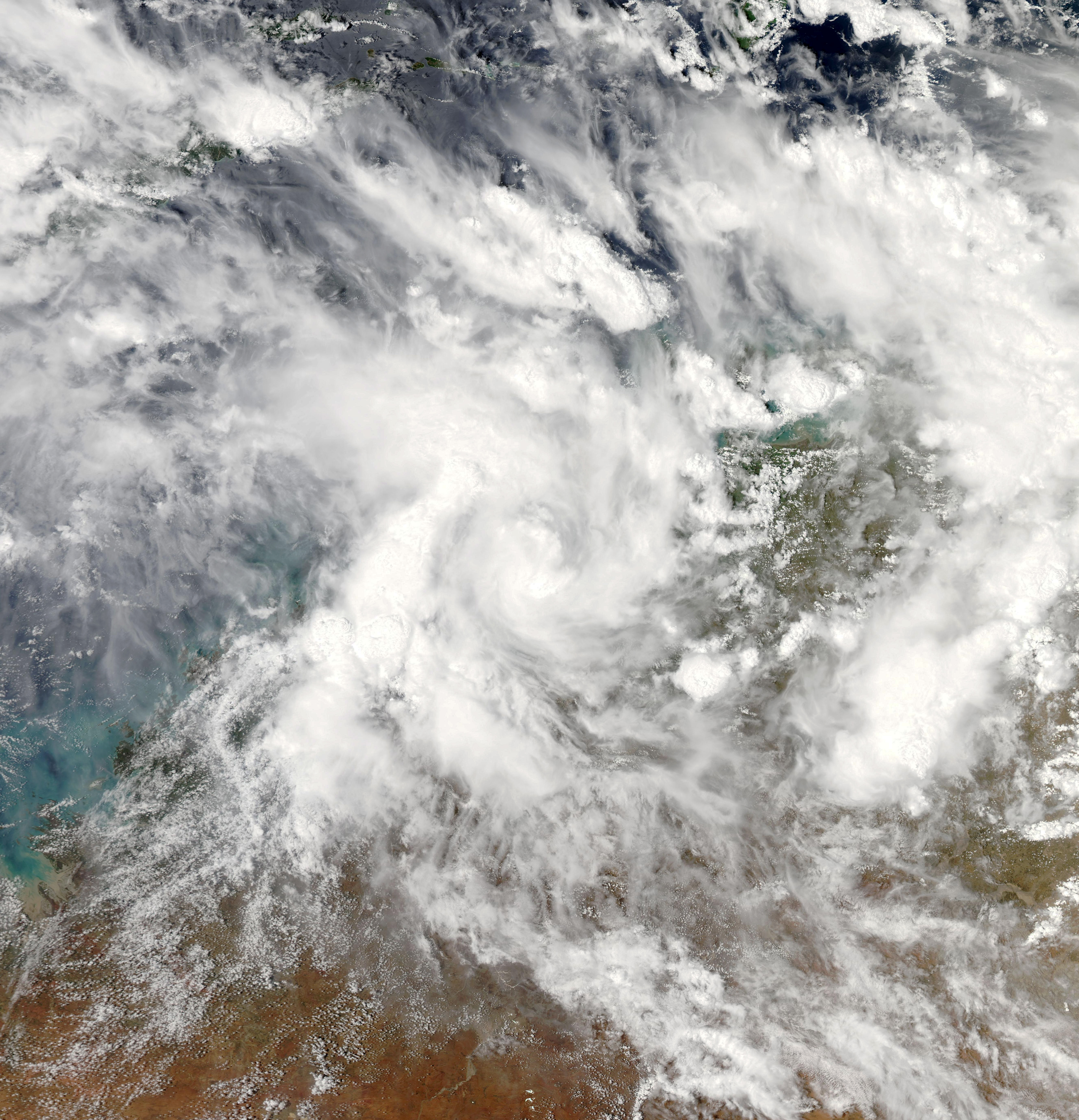
Cyclone Alessia on 25 November over the Top End region.

On 21 November, a cyclone watch was raised for coastal and nearby inland areas of Western Australia between Wyndham and Beagle Bay. This watch was soon expanded to encompass areas east to the Western Australia–Northern Territory border and west to the Mitchell Plateau. Additionally, areas from Mitchell Plateau to Cockatoo Island were placed under a cyclone warning. The following day, watches extended to Cape Hotham Light in the Northern Territory, including the city of Darwin and the Tiwi Islands. As the cyclone intensified, warnings gradually spread eastward. Warnings reached as far east as Point Stuart prior to Alessia's landfall. All watches and warnings were dropped on 24 November as Alessia moved inland and degraded to a tropical low.

Though impact from the storm was expected to be fairly minimal, residents were still advised to stock up on emergency supplies and be prepared. Northern Territory Police Commissioner, John McRoberts, urged residents to heed warnings despite the generally non-threatening nature of the storm, "complacency can often be your worst enemy in these types of events." Many stores across Darwin reported a sharp increase in the sales of bottled water due to the storm. Despite the approaching storm, regional airports, schools, and businesses remained open. Ferry service to the Tiwi Islands, however, was suspended for 24 November.

On 23 November, Cyclone Alessia brushed the Kimberley coastline of Western Australia as a low-end Category 1. The strongest winds were measured on Troughton Island at 69 km/h (43 mph) with gusts to 94 km/h (58 mph). The storm's brisk forward motion limited rainfall, however, with only 24.8 mm (0.98 in) falling on the island. Farther west, Kalumburu received 37.8 mm (1.49 in) of rain. Effects across the Top End region were similar to Kimberly, some reports of gale-force winds with generally light to moderate rain, peaking at 126 mm (5.0 in) along the Upper Wickham River. Owing to previously dry conditions, the rains proved mostly beneficial to the region. Flash flooding along the Goomadeer River in Arnhem Land caught at least seven people off-guard, including one infant, as their two vehicles were overcome with water. Six people safely made it out while another was swept downstream. He was rescued two days later by local police. In Darwin, strong winds downed a few trees in the Northern Suburbs and Howard Springs while localised flooding occurred in Palmerston. Additionally, one power line was downed in the city. Local authorities reported no serious traffic accidents in relation to the storm nor injuries. In Milne, a few residents seeking shelter at a local fire station found themselves locked out despite officials advising people to seek shelter if necessary.

=== Gulf of Carpentaria ===
Following Alessia's reorganization over the Gulf of Carpentaria early on 27 November, a cyclone warning was raised for areas between Port Roper, Northern Territory to Karumba, Queensland, including Mornington Island. Once the storm moved onshore in the Northern Territory, all watches and warnings were dropped later that same day. On Centre Island, daily rainfall peaked at 162.8 mm (6.41 in) on 27 November, with an additional 127.6 mm (5.02 in) falling over the subsequent three days as Alessia moved erratically in the southwestern Gulf of Carpentaria. Sustained winds of 87 km/h (54 mph) and gusts to 109 km/h (68 mph) affected the island during the storm's passage. The McArthur River zinc mine received 200 mm (7.9 in) of rain on 27 November. Heavy rains extended eastward into Queensland with 164.4 mm (6.47 in) falling on Mornington Island over a five-day period.

== See also ==
- 2013–14 Australian region cyclone season
- Cyclone Helen (2008)
