= Cyclone Joan =

Category 5 Australian region cyclone in 1975

Severe Tropical Cyclone Joan
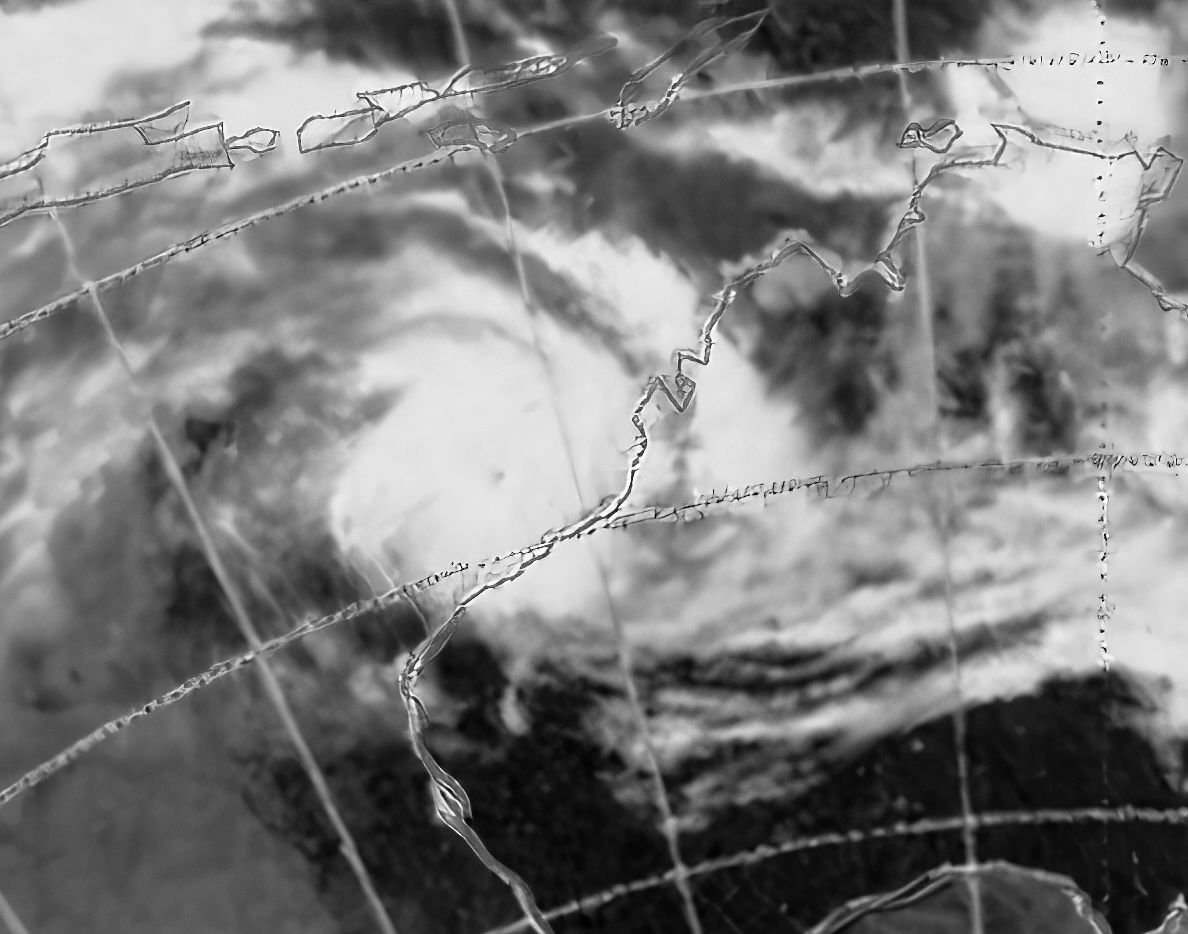
- Cyclone Joan at peak intensity on 7 December

Meteorological history
- Formed: 30 November 1975
- Dissipated: 10 December 1975

Category 5 severe tropical cyclone
- 10-minute sustained (BOM)
- Highest winds: 215 km/h (130 mph)
- Highest gusts: 260 km/h (160 mph)
- Lowest pressure: 915 hPa (mbar); 27.02 inHg

Category 4-equivalent tropical cyclone
- 1-minute sustained (SSHWS/JTWC)
- Highest winds: 230 km/h (145 mph)

Overall effects
- Fatalities: None
- Damage: $31 million (1975 USD)
- Areas affected: Western Australia
- IBTrACS
- Part of the 1975–76 Australian region cyclone season

Severe Tropical Cyclone Joan was an intense tropical cyclone that ravaged areas of Western Australia. Forming out of a tropical low on 30 November 1975, Joan gradually intensified as it tracked towards the west. After attaining Category 5 intensity on 5 December, the storm abruptly began to track southward and accelerated. The following day, the cyclone reached its peak intensity with winds of 215 km/h (130 mph) and a barometric pressure of 915 hPa (27.02 inHg). Joan only weakened slightly before making landfall in the vicinity of Mundabullagana. The cyclone rapidly weakened after landfall before dissipating over Western Australia on 12 December.

Although no fatalities resulted from Joan, the cyclone caused widespread destruction across areas of Western Australia. In Port Hedland, most of the structures were damaged as a result of the storm. In addition, 1,000 homes in the town were damaged or destroyed. Further inland, record rainfall caused widespread flooding in many areas, causing many rivers and streams to overflow. Due to the severity of the storm, the name Joan was retired after the season.

== Meteorological history ==
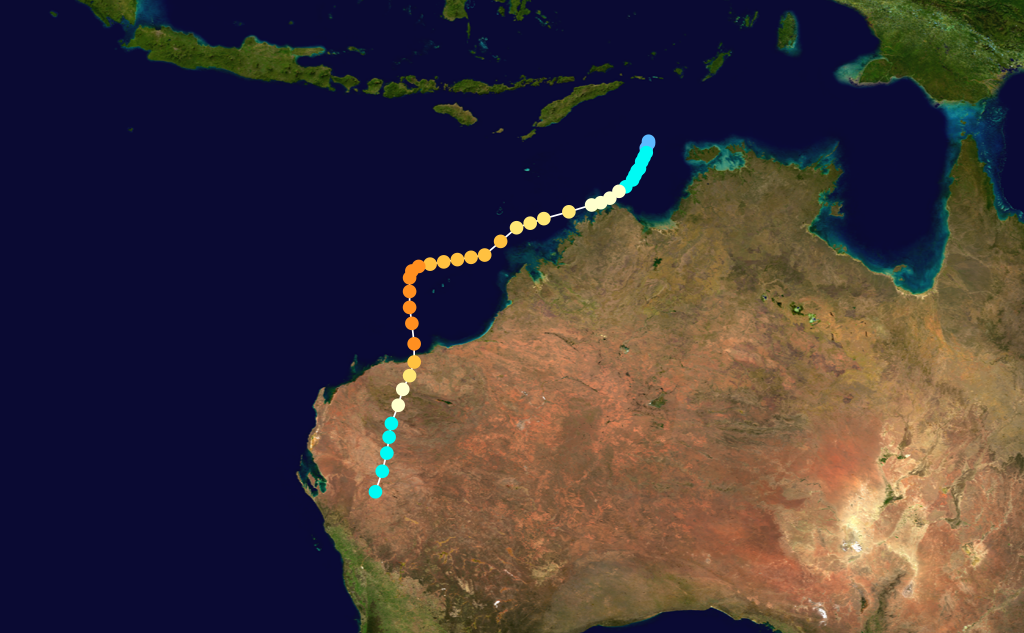
Map plotting the storm's track and intensity, according to the Saffir–Simpson scale Map key Saffir–Simpson scale Tropical depression (≤38 mph, ≤62 km/h) Tropical storm (39–73 mph, 63–118 km/h) Category 1 (74–95 mph, 119–153 km/h) Category 2 (96–110 mph, 154–177 km/h) Category 3 (111–129 mph, 178–208 km/h) Category 4 (130–156 mph, 209–251 km/h) Category 5 (≥157 mph, ≥252 km/h) Unknown Storm type Tropical cyclone Subtropical cyclone Extratropical cyclone, remnant low, tropical disturbance, or monsoon depression

Cyclone Joan originated from a mass of convection that formed northwest of Darwin on 30 November 1975. Due to its possibility of tropical development, the Australian Bureau of Meteorology began to monitor the system, issuing a tropical cyclone alert on the same day. Tracking southwest, the system gained organization, at which time it received the name Joan on the next day. As Joan progressed to the southwest, it steadily intensified in favorable conditions, strengthening into a Category 1 tropical cyclone on the Australian tropical cyclone intensity scale on the same day.

Joan continued to steadily intensify as it moved to the southwest, attaining Category 3 status on 2 December, classifying Joan as a severe tropical cyclone. On 5 December, the cyclone intensified into a Category 5 cyclone, the highest rating on the Australian tropical cyclone intensity scale with winds of 200 km/h (120 mph). On the next day, the forward motion of the storm slowed as while it passed to the north of Rowley Shoals, before abruptly turning towards the south, toward the Australian coast. Joan reached its peak intensity on 7 December, as it was moving south, with maximum wind speeds of 215 km/h (130 mph) and a minimum barometric pressure of 915 hPa (mbar; 27.02 inHg), based on Dvorak satellite intensity estimates.

Heading towards the south, Joan made landfall near Mundabullangana, Western Australia late on 7 December with winds of 220 km/h (140 mph) and an estimated pressure of 915 hPa (mbar; 27.02 inHg). After making landfall, the cyclone steadily weakened over land as it passed over areas of Western Australia. However, after crossing the Hamersley Range on 8 December, Joan began a phase a rapid weakening, and by the end of the day, its maximum sustained wind was only 100 km/h (62 mph). The system became merged with a broad low pressure area the next day before dissipating on 10 December. However, the Bureau of Meteorology continued to track the storm until 12 December.

== Preparations and impact ==
Prior to making landfall on Western Australia, six tropical cyclone alerts and 63 cyclone warnings were issued by the Bureau of Meteorology on Joan. The most severe type, the second cyclone warning phase, began to be initiated in three hour intervals beginning on 6 December after Joan made an abrupt turn towards the south. A total of 23 warnings were issued in the second cyclone warning phase. All locations along the coast from Kuri Bay to Exmouth were issued a tropical cyclone alert or warning at least once during the duration of Cyclone Joan.

Upon making landfall on 7 December, a 2.6 m (8.5 ft) storm surge was measured in Port Hedland, although surge was estimated to have peaked at 3.25 m (10.7 ft). However, since this occurred during lower tides, inundation of inland areas was not as severe as past tropical cyclones affecting the Port Hedland area. An estimated 85% of houses on Port Hedland were destroyed, with all structures near the coast being damaged to some degree. Due to nearly constant wave action, beach sand was piled to a depth of 2 m (6.6 ft). An estimated 1,000 houses were destroyed in the town due to Joan. 50 families in Port Hedland were left homeless as a result of the cyclone.

Further inland flooding resulted from heavy rains dropped by a weakening Joan. Rainfall peaked at 591 mm (23.3 in) near the Marandoo mine. Multiple locations recorded either near 24-hour rainfall records or broke the previous 24-hour rainfall records. Flooded streams resulted in washaways along railway lines. In addition the Yule River was flooded by the heavy rains. The total repair cost of damages caused by floods in the Pilbara region totaled to A$1.5 million (US$1.9 million). (Note: All USD converted figures are based on the exchange rate from 7 December 1975) Food supply to Wittenoom became drastically limited after several roads were washed away. It was estimated that the return periods of the floods caused by Joan were in excess of 50 years.

Total damages from the storm were estimated to be at least A$25 million (US$31 million), although no casualties were reported as a result of Cyclone Joan. Due to the severity of the storm, the name Joan was retired after the season.

== See also ==
- List of cyclones in Western Australia
- List of most intense tropical cyclones
- Cyclone Alessia (2013)
- Cyclone Tracy
