= Centre Island (Australia) =

Coordinates: 15°41′S 136°47′E

Centre Island is a small, uninhabited island in the Sir Edward Pellew Group of Islands in the Gulf of Carpentaria within the Northern Territory of Australia.

An automated weather station run by the Bureau of Meteorology has been operating on the island since 1968. Temperatures range from 23.8 °C to 31.2 °C and the average annual rainfall is 1053.4 mm.

== Climate ==
Climate data for Centre Island, elevation 12 m (39 ft), (1991–2020 normals, extremes 1974–present)
Month	Jan	Feb	Mar	Apr	May	Jun	Jul	Aug	Sep	Oct	Nov	Dec	Year
Record high °C (°F)	40.6 (105.1)	40.6 (105.1)	40.2 (104.4)	37.9 (100.2)	35.1 (95.2)	33.0 (91.4)	32.3 (90.1)	33.3 (91.9)	36.5 (97.7)	39.2 (102.6)	39.5 (103.1)	41.6 (106.9)	41.6 (106.9)
Mean daily maximum °C (°F)	33.8 (92.8)	33.4 (92.1)	33.3 (91.9)	32.3 (90.1)	29.5 (85.1)	27.0 (80.6)	26.6 (79.9)	28.1 (82.6)	31.0 (87.8)	33.3 (91.9)	34.9 (94.8)	34.9 (94.8)	31.5 (88.7)
Mean daily minimum °C (°F)	26.7 (80.1)	26.7 (80.1)	26.5 (79.7)	25.5 (77.9)	22.6 (72.7)	19.8 (67.6)	18.9 (66.0)	19.6 (67.3)	22.4 (72.3)	25.0 (77.0)	26.8 (80.2)	27.3 (81.1)	24.0 (75.2)
Record low °C (°F)	19.0 (66.2)	21.5 (70.7)	22.0 (71.6)	18.8 (65.8)	14.4 (57.9)	13.2 (55.8)	12.0 (53.6)	12.4 (54.3)	14.5 (58.1)	14.5 (58.1)	20.0 (68.0)	22.3 (72.1)	12.0 (53.6)
Average rainfall mm (inches)	267.2 (10.52)	265.9 (10.47)	187.8 (7.39)	92.9 (3.66)	7.2 (0.28)	5.0 (0.20)	1.8 (0.07)	1.8 (0.07)	1.7 (0.07)	6.1 (0.24)	43.3 (1.70)	161.8 (6.37)	1,042.5 (41.04)
Average rainy days (≥ 1.0 mm)	11.7	11.3	8.0	3.8	0.9	0.4	0.1	0.1	0.2	0.6	2.4	7.1	46.6
Source: Australian Bureau of Meteorology
