= 2013 Pacific hurricane season =

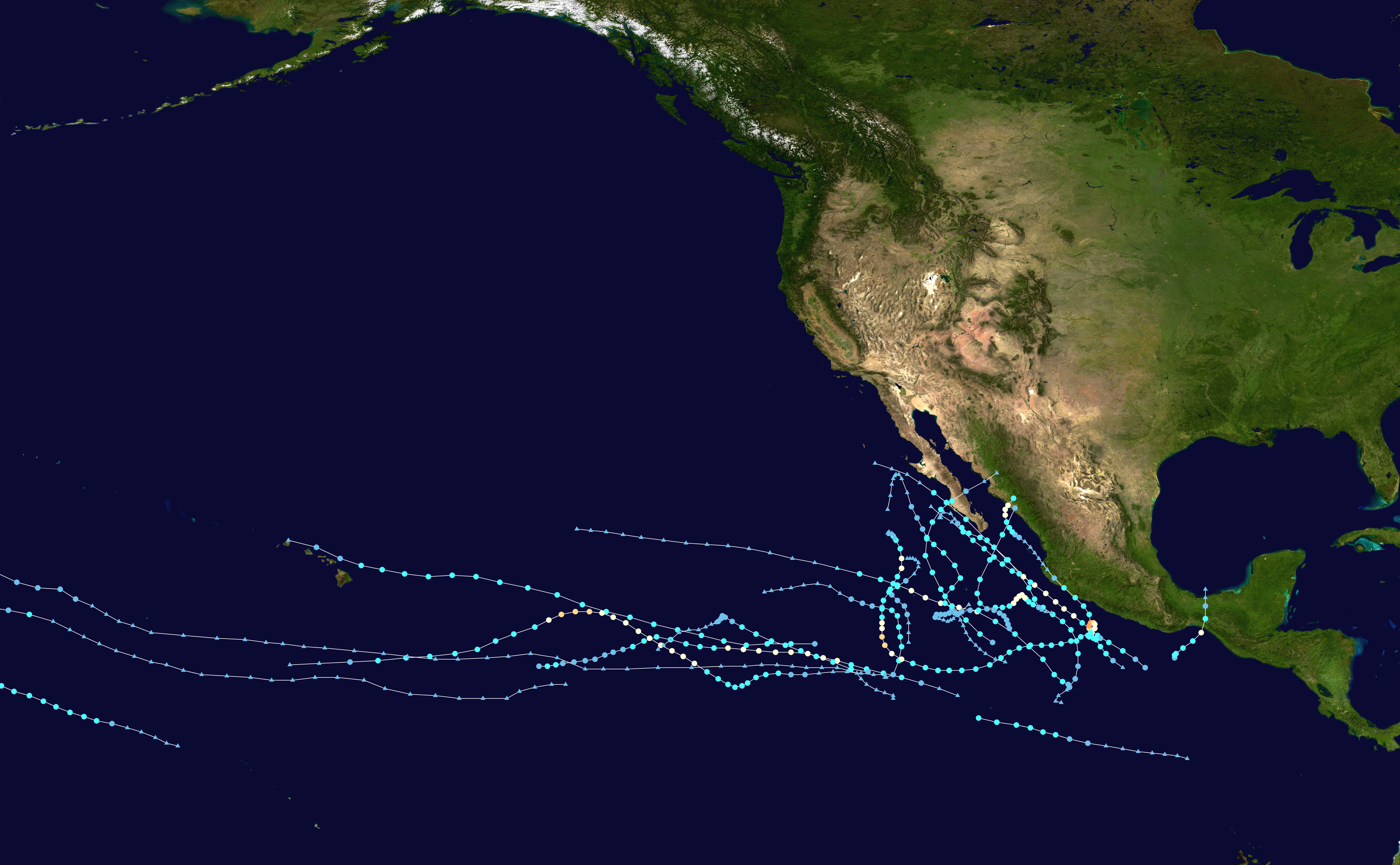
- Season summary map

Seasonal boundaries
- First system formed: May 15, 2013
- Last system dissipated: November 4, 2013

Strongest storm
- Name: Raymond
  - Maximum winds: 125 mph (205 km/h) (1-minute sustained)
  - Lowest pressure: 951 mbar (hPa; 28.08 inHg)

Seasonal statistics
- Total depressions: 21
- Total storms: 20
- Hurricanes: 9
- Major hurricanes (Cat. 3+): 1
- ACE: 74.2 units
- Total fatalities: 183 total
- Total damage: $4.47 billion (2013 USD) (Second-costliest Pacific hurricane season on record)

Related articles
- Timeline of the 2013 Pacific hurricane season; 2013 Atlantic hurricane season; 2013 Pacific typhoon season; 2013 North Indian Ocean cyclone season

The 2013 Pacific hurricane season was an above average Pacific hurricane season with 21 tropical cyclones forming. Of these, 20 became named storms – 18 in the Eastern Pacific basin (east of 140°W), and 2 in the Central Pacific basin (between 140°W and the International Date Line). Of the 18 named storms in the east, 9 became hurricanes, with one, Raymond, becoming the season's only major hurricane (category three or higher on the Saffir–Simpson hurricane wind scale). In the Central Pacific, neither named storm became a hurricane. It was also a below-normal season in terms of Accumulated cyclone energy (ACE), as many of its systems were weak and short-lived. The season officially began on May 15 in the Eastern Pacific and started on June 1 in the Central Pacific; both ended on November 30. These dates conventionally delimit the period of each year when most tropical development occurs in these North Pacific basins. The first cyclone, Tropical Storm Alvin, formed on May 15, and the last, Tropical Storm Sonia, dissipated on November 4.

Several systems directly affected Mexico this season. Hurricane Barbara brought widespread heavy rains to much of Southwestern Mexico and Central America in late May. Damage estimates from the storm range from $50 to $356 million (2013 USD). Hurricane Erick, and Tropical Storms Ivo and Juliette threatened Baja California Sur; Ivo also triggered flash floods across the Southwestern United States. In mid-September, Hurricane Manuel killed at least 169 people in Mexico, and was responsible for significant damage to the western coast and the area around Acapulco. Tropical Storms Juliette, Octave, and Sonia also made landfall in Baja California or northwestern Mexico, bringing with them heavy rains and strong winds. Additionally, Hurricane Raymond, which remained offshore, was the only major hurricane of the year.

== Seasonal forecasts ==
Predictions of tropical activity in the 2013 season
Source	Date	Named storms	Hurricanes	Major hurricanes	Ref
Average (1981 – 2010)		15.4	8.4	3.9
Record high activity		27	16 (tie)	11
Record low activity		8 (tie)	3	0 (tie)
CPC	May 23, 2013	11–16	5–8	1–4
	Actual activity	20	9	1

On May 21, the Central Pacific Hurricane Center (CPHC) released its forecast for tropical activity across the Central Pacific during 2013. In its report, the organization predicted a 70 percent chance of a below-average season, a 25 percent chance of a near-average season, and a 5 percent chance of an above-average season, equating to 1–3 tropical cyclones across the basin. An average season yields 4–5 tropical cyclones. This forecast was based primarily on the expectation of Neutral El Niño–Southern Oscillation conditions and a continuation of the positive Atlantic multidecadal oscillation.

Two days later, the Climate Prediction Center (CPC) issued its forecast for tropical activity across the East Pacific during 2013. With near or below average sea surface temperatures in the eastern equatorial Pacific and a continuation of the climate pattern responsible for the ongoing era of low Pacific hurricane activity that began in 1995, the organization called for a 55 percent chance of a below-average season, a 35 percent chance of a near-average season, and a 10 percent chance of an above-average season. In total, the CPC predicted 11–16 named storms, 5–8 hurricanes, and 1–4 major hurricanes; an average season yields 15.4 named storms, 8.4 hurricanes, and 3.9 major hurricanes. Both the CPHC and CPC stressed the importance of being prepared prior to the start of the season, noting that significant tropical cyclones can occur even in below-average seasons.

== Seasonal summary ==
List of costliest Pacific hurricane seasons
Rank	Cost	Season
1	≥$13.1 billion	2023
2	$4.47 billion	2013
3	≥$3.15 billion	1992
4	$2.46 billion	2024
5	≥$2.09 billion	2014
6	≥$1.64 billion	2018
7	$1.62 billion	2010
8	$1.31 billion	1982
10	$918.15 million	2026
10	$850 million	1998

Least intense Pacific hurricane seasons
Rank	Season	ACE value
1	1977	22.3
2	2010	51.2
3	2007	51.6
4	1996	53.9
5	2003	56.6
6	1979	57.4
7	2004	71.1
8	1981	72.8
9	2013	74.8
10	2020	77.3

Overall, the hurricane season was very active in terms of named storms, but it was near to below normal in terms of hurricanes and major hurricanes. There were twenty tropical storms. In addition, nine hurricanes formed. Furthermore, there was only one major hurricane, meaning Category 3 or higher on the Saffir-Simpson Hurricane Wind Scale (SSHWS). The season was also very costly and deadly, primarily due to Hurricane Manuel, which caused 169 deaths in western Mexico and $4.47 billion in damages. The accumulated cyclone energy (ACE) index within the eastern Pacific Ocean, officially calculated by the National Hurricane Center (NHC), was 74.9 units (Note: The total represents the sum of the squares of the maximum sustained wind speed (knots) for every (sub)tropical storm's intensity of over 33 knots (38 mph; 61 km/h), divided by 10,000 while they are above that threshold; therefore, tropical depressions are not included.), indicating a below-normal season, as many of its systems were weak and short-lived.

The season's first tropical storm formed on May 15, coinciding with the official start of the Pacific hurricane season. On average, a tropical cyclone develops in May in the eastern Pacific every other year. The formation of Barbara in late May marked only the fifth time since 1949 that two tropical storms formed during the month.. After nearly a month of inactivity in the season, Hurricane Cosme formed on June 23, causing flooding on Mexico's Pacific coast and leaving three people dead. Hurricane Dalila formed on June 29, causing minimal damage in southwestern Mexico. In July, Hurricane Erick caused moderate damage in western Mexico and left three people dead. Tropical Storm Flossie nearly made landfall in Hawaii as a tropical storm before dissipating. Hurricane Gil formed in late July but did not affect any areas.

In August, there were six tropical cyclones during the season: Hurricane Henriette reached Category 2 strength but did not make landfall. In the Central Pacific, Pewa, Unala, and Three-C formed in the middle of the month; all three crossed the International Date Line into the Western Pacific. Tropical Storms Ivo and Juliette brought heavy rains to the Baja California Peninsula. Hurricane Kiko formed on August 30. September was relatively quiet in terms of the number of tropical cyclones, but it proved deadly and devastating, largely due to Hurricane Manuel, which caused severe damage in Western and Northern Mexico, becoming, at the time, the costliest Pacific hurricane in the basin. However, it was surpassed by Hurricane Otis ten years later. Manuel was also the deadliest hurricane since Tropical Storm Agatha in 2010. October saw four tropical cyclones during the season, including Hurricane Raymond, the only major hurricane on record. The final storm of the season, Sonia, which formed on November 1, caused minor damage in northwestern Mexico. The season ended on November 30.

== Systems ==
=== Tropical Storm Alvin ===
- Tropical storm (SSHWS)
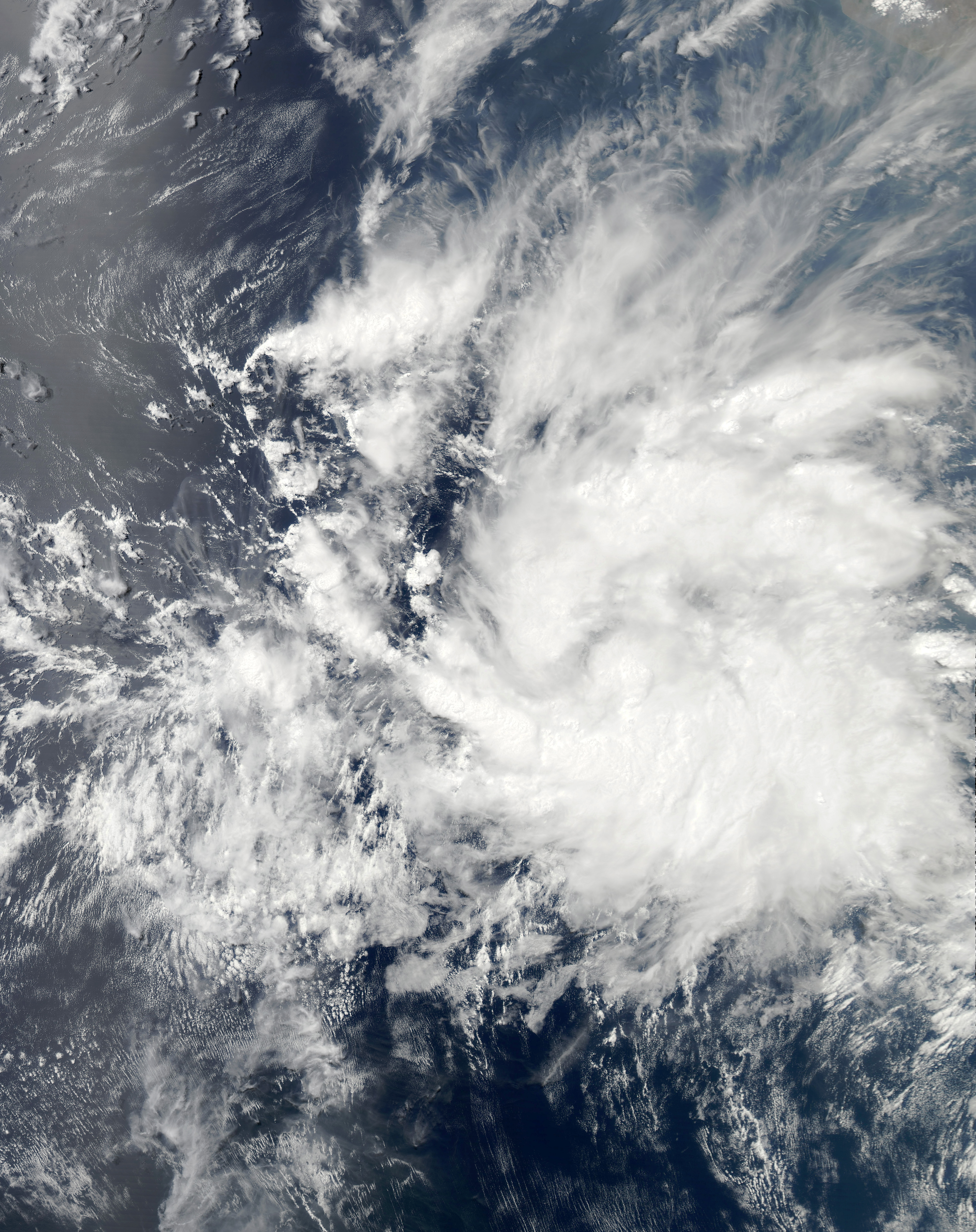
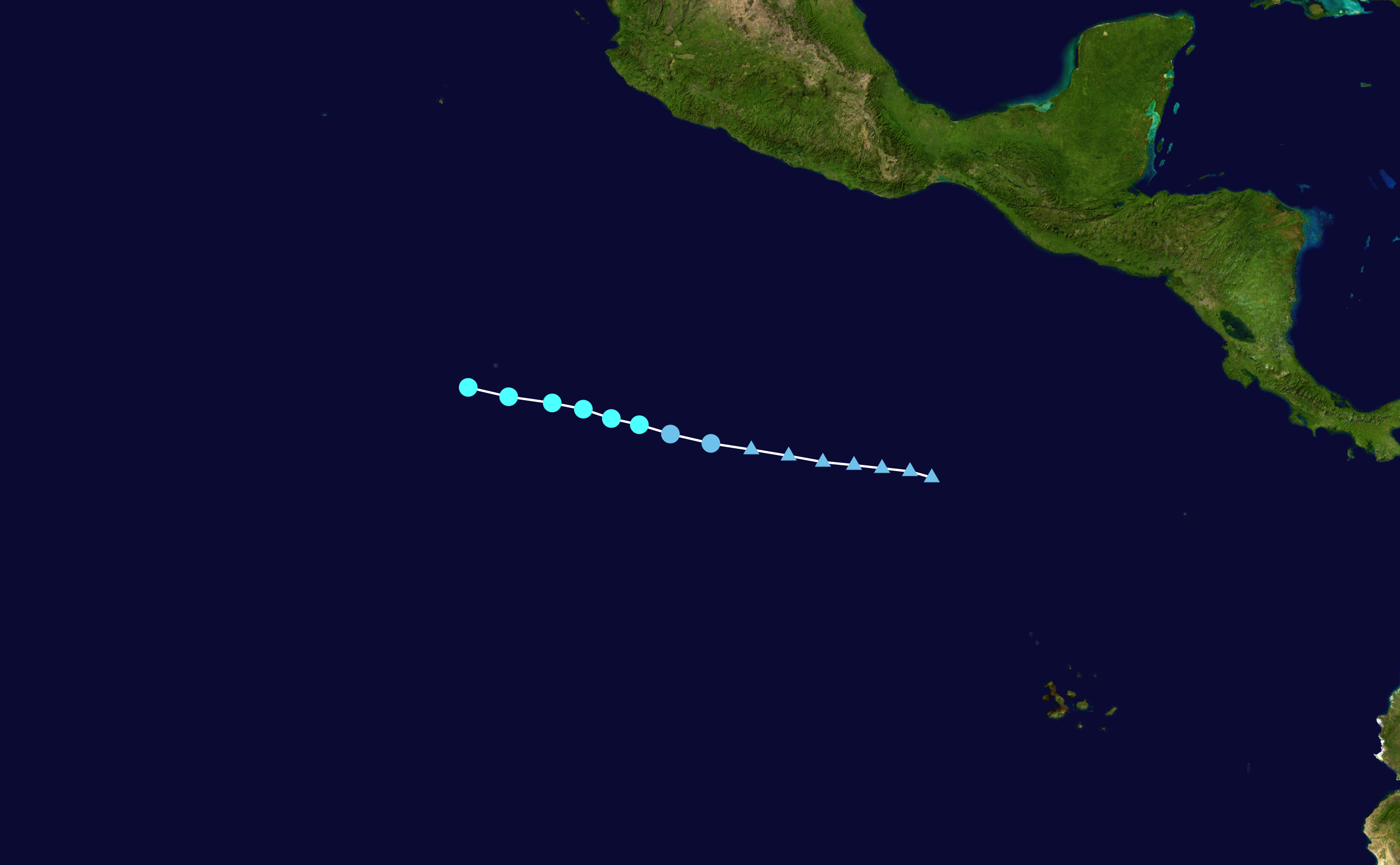
- Duration: May 15 – May 17
- Peak intensity: 60 mph (95 km/h) (1-min); 1000 mbar (hPa)

A tropical wave was first observed over the southeastern Caribbean Sea on May 4. The wave entered the East Pacific a few days later, where atmospheric conditions allowed for gradual development. Curved bands of convection developed around a defined center early on May 15, leading to the formation of a tropical depression around 06:00 UTC that day; at 7.8°N, the depression tied 1976's Hurricane Annette as the second-lowest-latitude tropical cyclone to form in the East Pacific. Twelve hours later, the depression intensified into Tropical Storm Alvin. Influenced by a subtropical ridge over central Mexico, Alvin steadily strengthened and reached peak winds of 60 mph (95 km/h) early on May 16. Thereafter, increasing wind shear and the introduction of mid-level dry air caused the cyclone to begin a quick weakening trend. The low-level circulation became increasingly elongated and opened up into a trough at 00:00 UTC on May 17. Six hours later, Alvin dissipated while located about 775 mi (1,247 km) southwest of Manzanillo, Mexico.

=== Hurricane Barbara ===
- Category 1 hurricane (SSHWS)
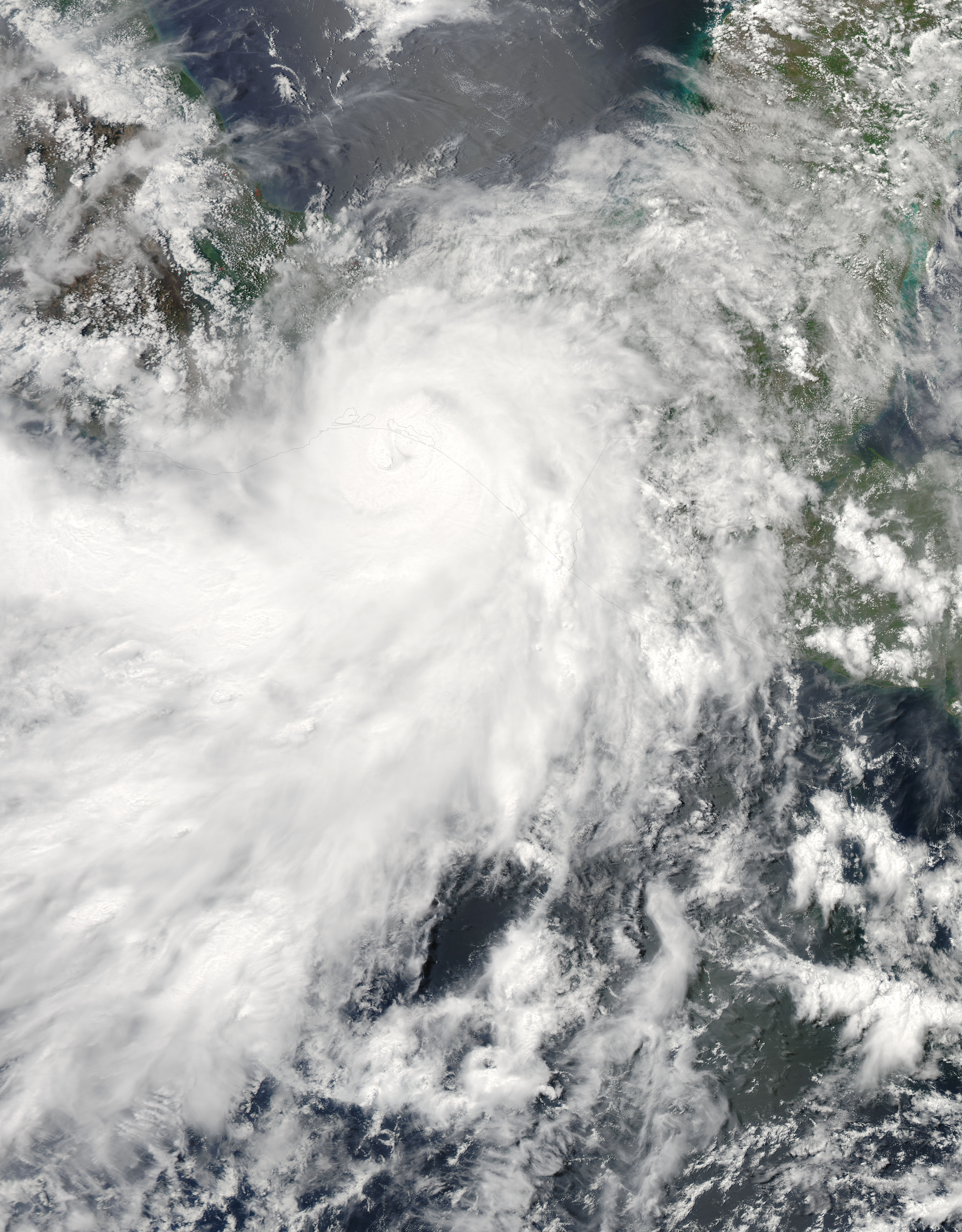
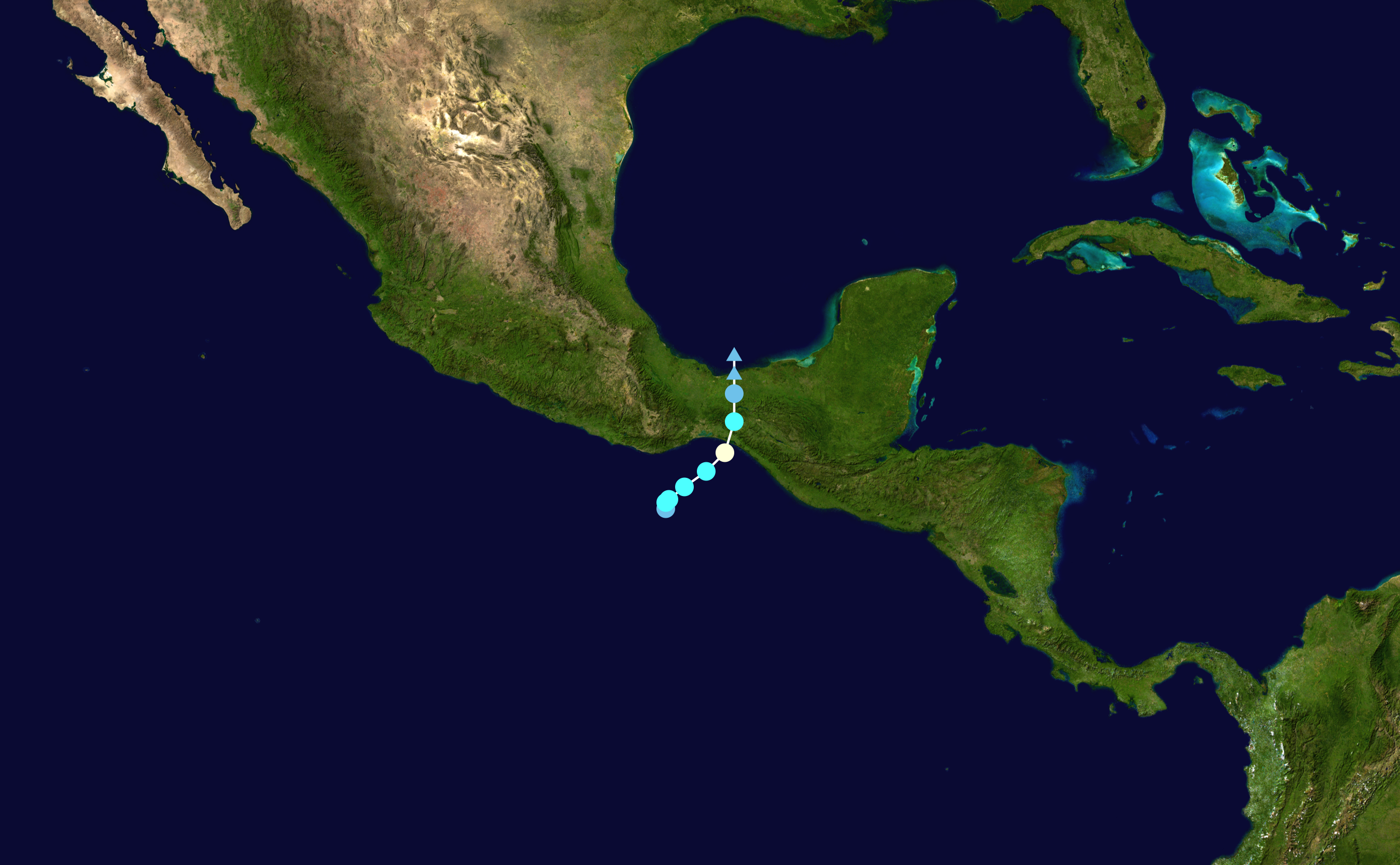
- Duration: May 28 – May 30
- Peak intensity: 80 mph (130 km/h) (1-min); 983 mbar (hPa)

A tropical wave emerged off the western coast of Africa on May 16, entering the East Pacific on May 24. Following the passage of an atmospheric kelvin wave, a broad area of low pressure formed and gradually organized as convection simultaneously increased. At 12:00 UTC on May 28, the wave was declared a tropical depression; six hours later, the depression intensified into Tropical Storm Barbara. Steered northeastward amid favorable atmospheric conditions, a period of rapid deepening ensued, and the system was upgraded to a Category 1 hurricane at 18:00 UTC on May 29. At 19:50 UTC that day, Barbara attained peak winds of 80 mph (130 km/h) as it moved ashore west-southwest of Tonalá, Chiapas. The cyclone quickly weakened thereafter as it passed over the Sierra Madre mountain range. At 00:00 UTC on May 30, Barbara weakened to a tropical storm, and by six hours later, it further weakened to a tropical depression. After losing its deep convection, the depression degenerated into a remnant low at 12:00 UTC, while located over the Bay of Campeche. The remnant low opened into a trough at 00:00 UTC on May 31.

The precursor disturbance brought rainfall to El Salvador, where one person was killed. In Mexico, rainfall peaked at 470 mm (19 in). Even though Hurricane Barbara struck a largely undeveloped stretch of coastal lagoons, containing small fishing villages, two elderly people were killed in Oaxaca. Furthermore, 14 fishermen were left missing off the coast of Tapanatepec; eight of which were found alive. The towns of Tonala and Arriaga were the worst affected by the hurricane. Although damage was minor, 50 people were evacuated and 2,000 homes were damaged. Throughout the region, 57,000 people were homeless and 10,000 hectares of crops were destroyed. Total losses were estimated at 1.89 billion pesos (US$148 million).

=== Hurricane Cosme ===
- Category 1 hurricane (SSHWS)
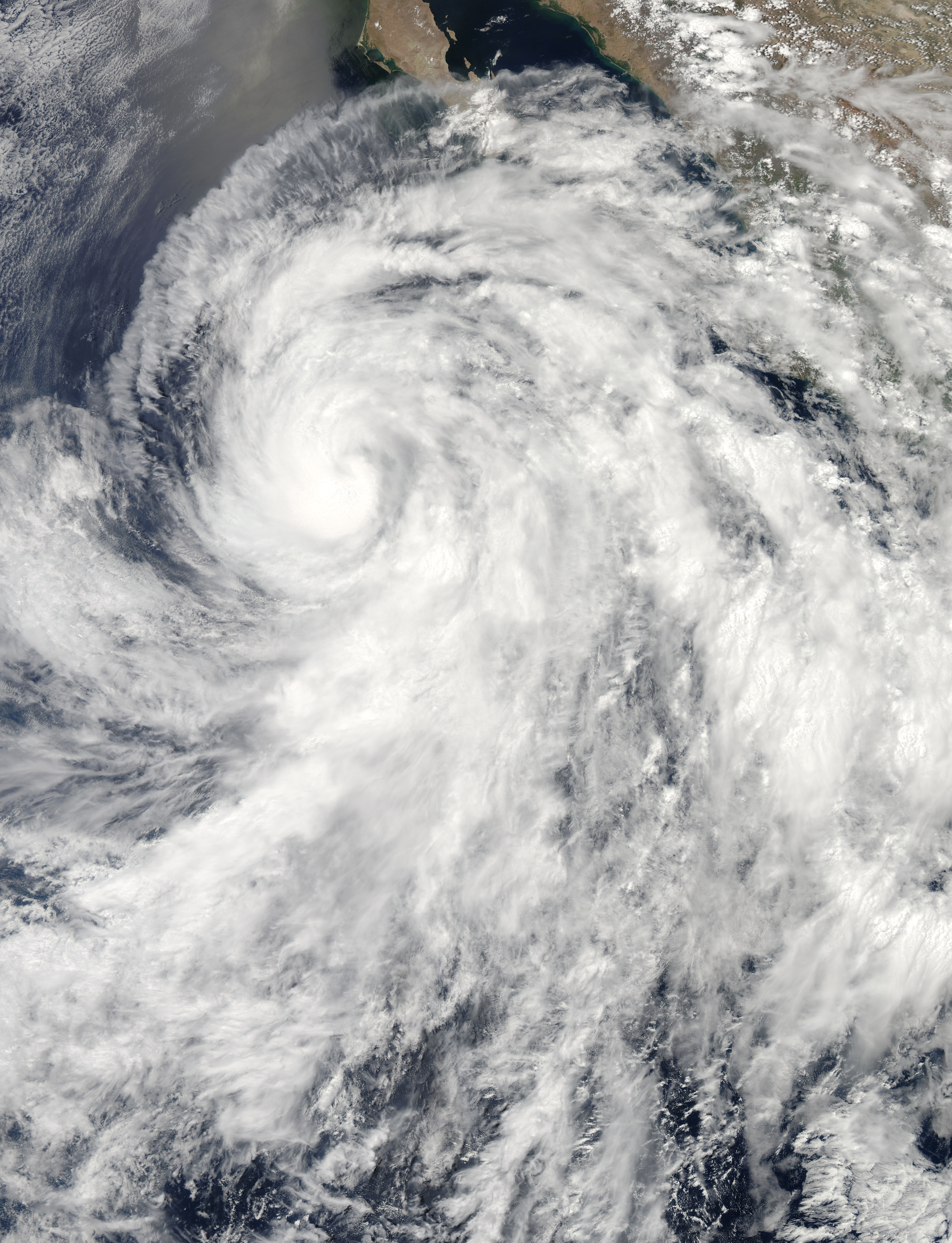
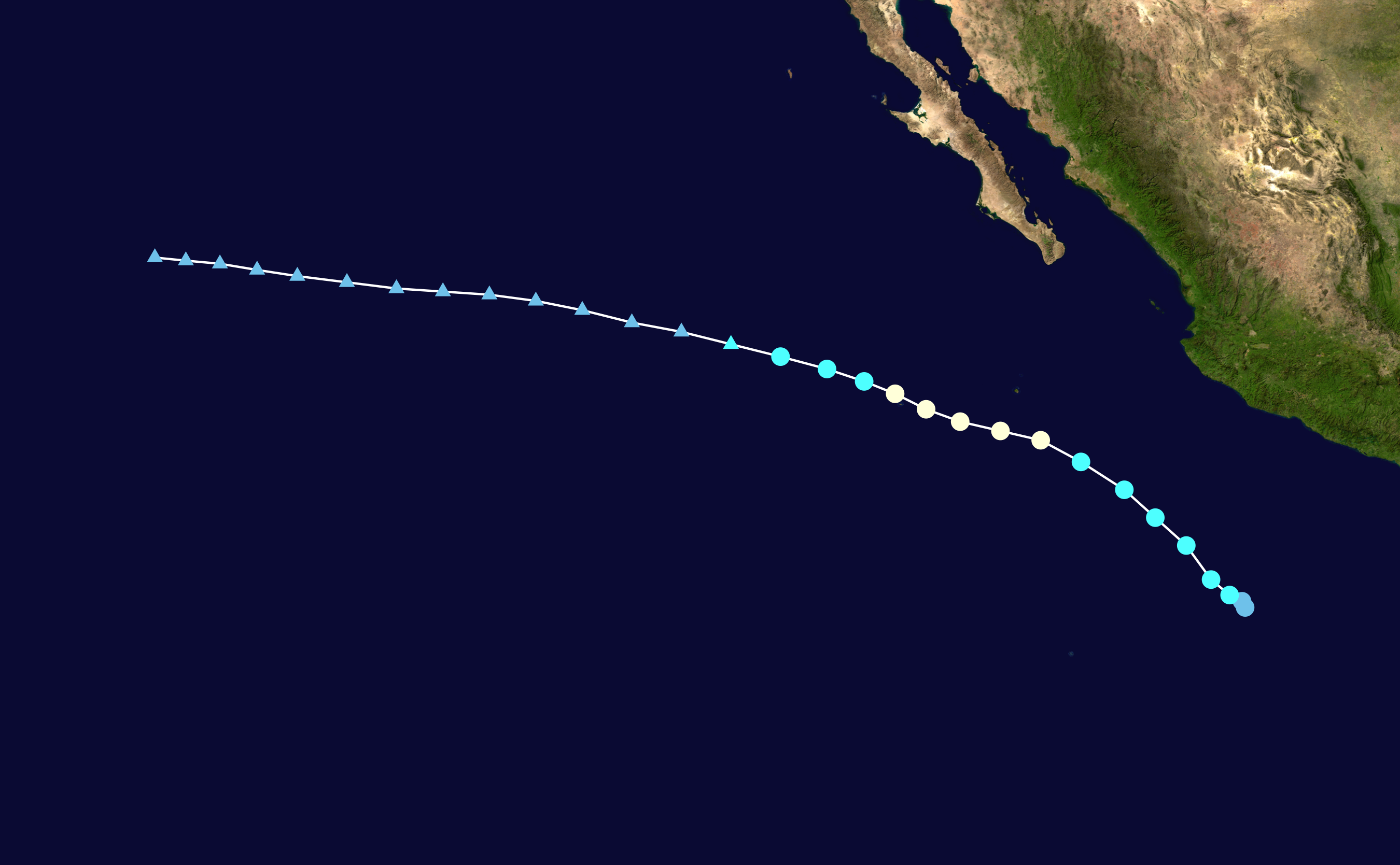
- Duration: June 23 – June 27
- Peak intensity: 85 mph (140 km/h) (1-min); 980 mbar (hPa)

A tropical wave, the same responsible for Tropical Storm Barry in the Atlantic, moved across the eastern Pacific in late June, yielding a broad area of low pressure by June 21. Northwesterly shear initially hindered development of the system, but a subsequent decrease in upper-level winds, as well as the passage of an eastward-moving kelvin wave, led to the formation of a tropical depression by 12:00 UTC on June 23; twelve hours later, the depression intensified into Tropical Storm Cosme. Steered northwest and eventually west-northwest, the cyclone intensified amid favorable atmospheric dynamics, becoming a minimal hurricane by 12:00 UTC on June 25 and attaining peak winds of 85 mph (135 km/h) twelve hours later. A track over cooler waters and into an increasingly stable environment caused Cosme to weaken to a tropical storm by 18:00 UTC on June 26 and further degenerate into a remnant low by 12:00 UTC the next day while located about 690 mi (1,110 km) west-southwest of Cabo San Lucas, Mexico. The remnant low tracked westward prior to dissipating well east-southeast of the Hawaiian Islands on July 1.

Due to the storm's large size, a "green" alert (low risk) was issued for the states of Colima, Jalisco and Michoacán while a "blue" alert (minimum risk) was placed into effect for the states of Nayarit, Guerrero, and Baja California Sur. As the system passed through the Revillagigedo Islands, winds reached 42 mph (68 km/h) on Socorro Island. The outer rainbands brought moderate rains to Guerrero, causing minor flooding in Acapulco. Across the state, the storm generated 24 landslides, which blocked highways. Two people were killed in the Guerrero, one a tourist that drowned in Zihuatanejo and the other a police officer in an airplane crash that injured 19 others. High seas flooded numerous buildings across coastal towns in Colima, damaging 34 tourist facilities and killing one person. Additionally, many restaurants built of wood and coconut were damaged. In Manzanillo, the port was closed to small craft, as was the port of Mazatlán. Overall, 50 homes were damaged by the storm.

=== Hurricane Dalila ===
- Category 1 hurricane (SSHWS)
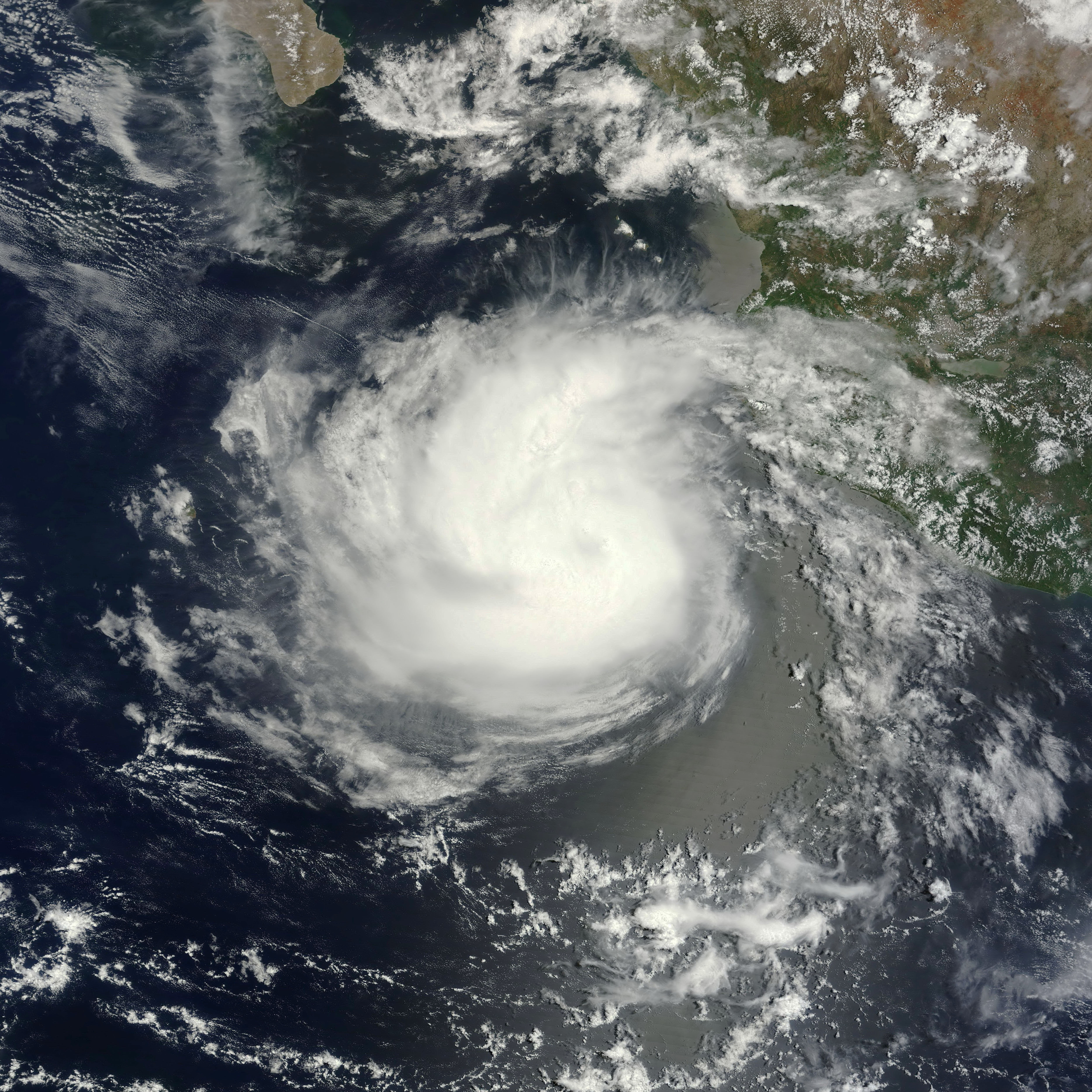
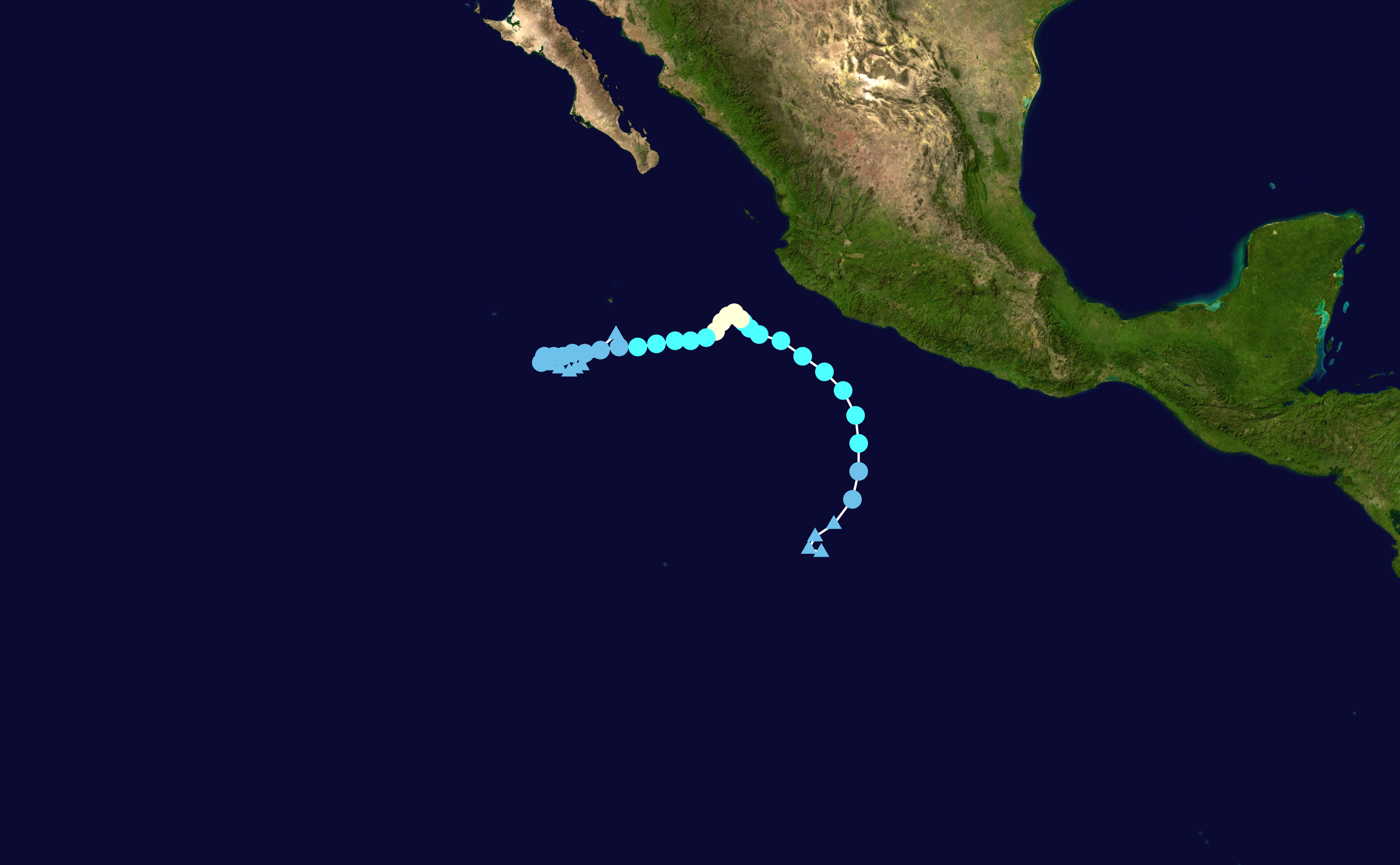
- Duration: June 29 – July 7
- Peak intensity: 80 mph (130 km/h) (1-min); 984 mbar (hPa)

A tropical wave was first observed over the central Atlantic on June 17. It entered the East Pacific on June 24 and steadily organized, acquiring enough organization to be declared a tropical depression by 18:00 UTC on June 29. Twelve hours later, it was upgraded to Tropical Storm Dalila. Steered northwest parallel to the coastline of Mexico, the cyclone only slowly organized despite favorable conditions, becoming a Category 1 hurricane by 12:00 UTC on July 2. After attaining peak winds of 80 mph (130 km/h) six hours later, the influence of drier air and increasing shear caused the storm to begin a weakening trend. At 18:00 UTC on July 3, Dalila was downgraded to a tropical storm, and by 00:00 UTC on July 5, the system further weakened to a tropical depression. After becoming devoid of convection, Dalila degenerated into a remnant low at 06:00 UTC on July 7 while located roughly 460 mi (740 km) south-southwest of Cabo San Lucas, Mexico. The low turned east-northeastward into the circulation of Tropical Storm Erick thereafter, dissipating late on July 8.

When Dalila threatened Western Mexico, the states of Colima, Michoacán, and Jalisco went under a yellow alert; Nayarit was placed on a green alert. Blue alerts were issued for Baja California Sur, Sinaloa, Guerrero, and Oaxaca. The port of Manzanillo was closed as a precaution, where the storm brought rain and storm surge. The outer rainbands of the storm also brought moderate to heavy rainfall along coastal areas of Colima and Jalisco. A total of 49 structures were damaged due to the storm.

=== Hurricane Erick ===
- Category 1 hurricane (SSHWS)
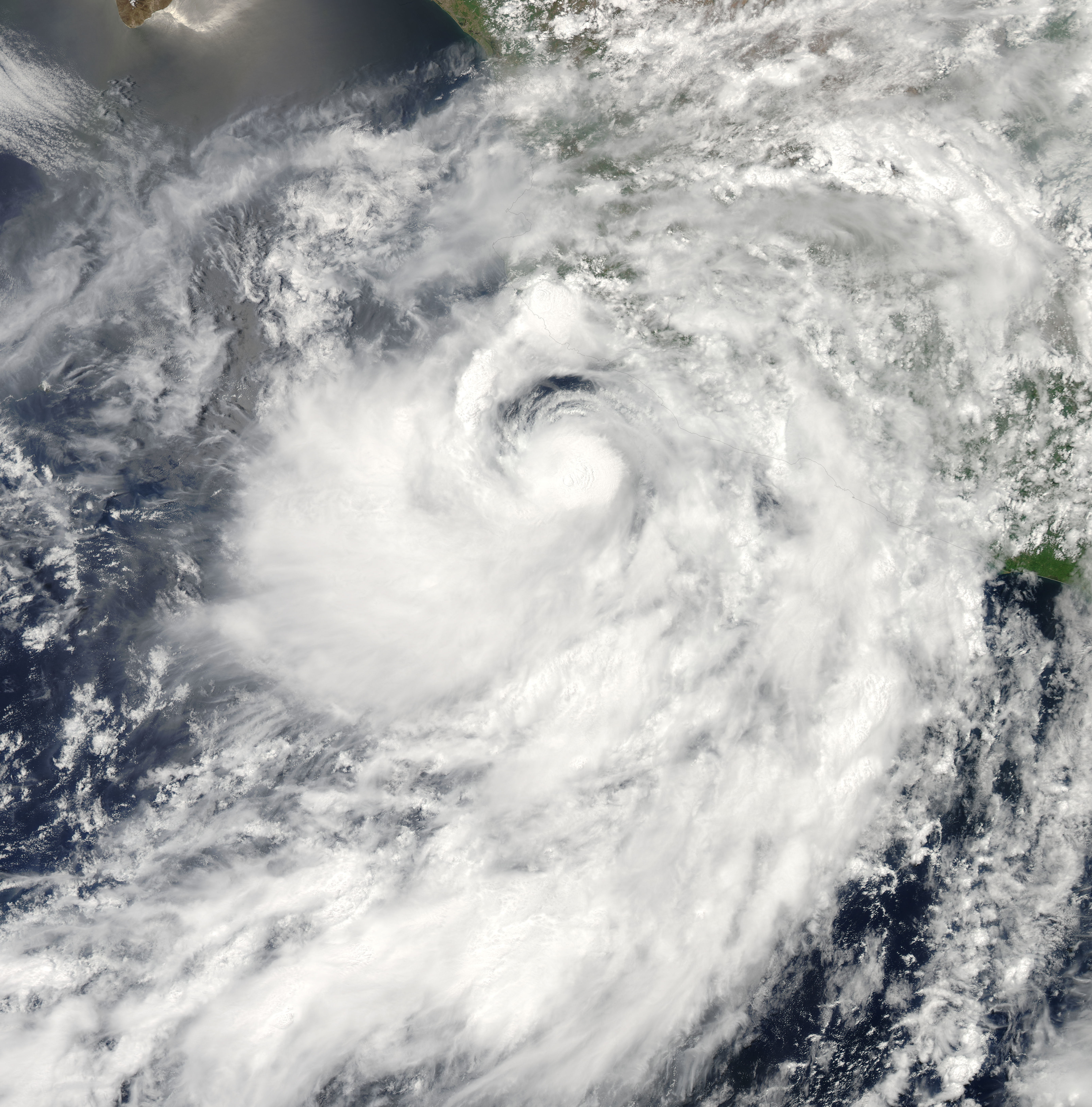
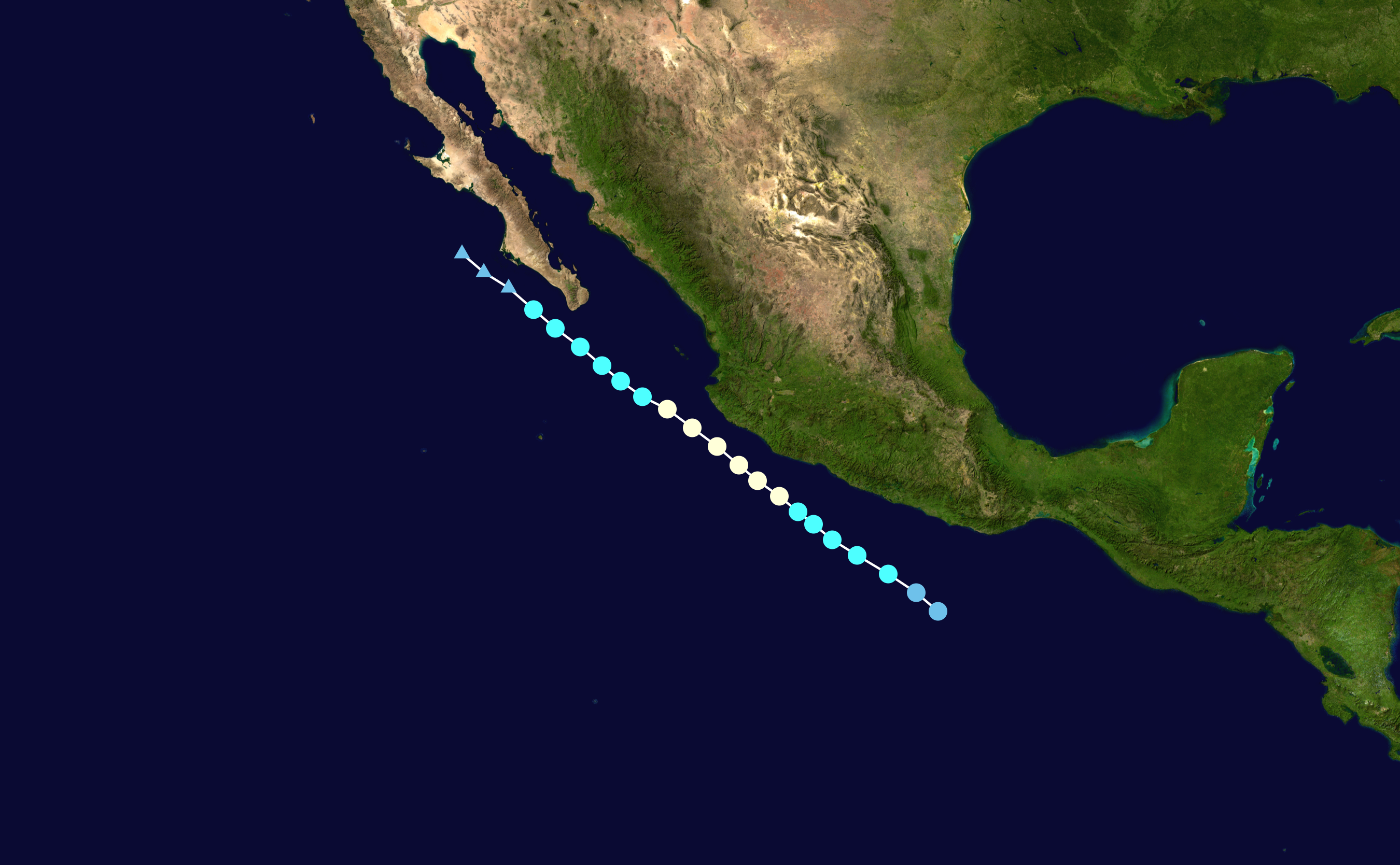
- Duration: July 4 – July 9
- Peak intensity: 80 mph (130 km/h) (1-min); 983 mbar (hPa)

A tropical wave moved off the western coast of Africa on June 18 and continued westward across Central America and into the eastern Pacific by June 29. It subsequently interacted with a large cyclonic gyre, leading to an increase in convective activity and the formation of an area of low pressure. Following satellite and microwave data, the disturbance was upgraded to a tropical depression at 1200 UTC on July 4. Initially, moderate easterly shear prevented much organization as the system tracked west-northwest; however, a reprieve in upper-level winds by 0000 UTC on July 5 allowed the depression to intensify into Tropical Storm Erick as convective bands gained more curvature. A period of steady intensification over the next day allowed the system to attain Category 1 hurricane intensity at 0600 UTC and reach its peak with winds of 80 mph (130 km/h) and a minimum barometric pressure of 983 mbar (983 hPa; 29.0 inHg) six hours later. Decreasing ocean temperatures caused the convective appearance to deteriorate at a steady pace; by 1800 UTC on July 7, Erick weakened to a tropical storm, and by 0600 UTC on July 9, the system no longer sustained enough organization to be considered a tropical cyclone.

The outer rainbands of the storm brought gusty winds just offshore the Mexican coast. In Acapulco and Puerto Marques, the storm was responsible for minor flooding. Elsewhere across the state, most of the damage was due to landslides. Along the coast of Colima, 9-foot (2.7 m) waves were recorded. Although some flooding was reported across the state, damage was minor. Further north, in Nayarit, however, damage was extensive. One woman died. One river overflowed its banks, which directly affected numerous cities. The Mexican military and officials in Nayarit attempted to rescue hundreds of people affected by Hurricane Erick.

=== Tropical Storm Flossie ===
- Tropical storm (SSHWS)
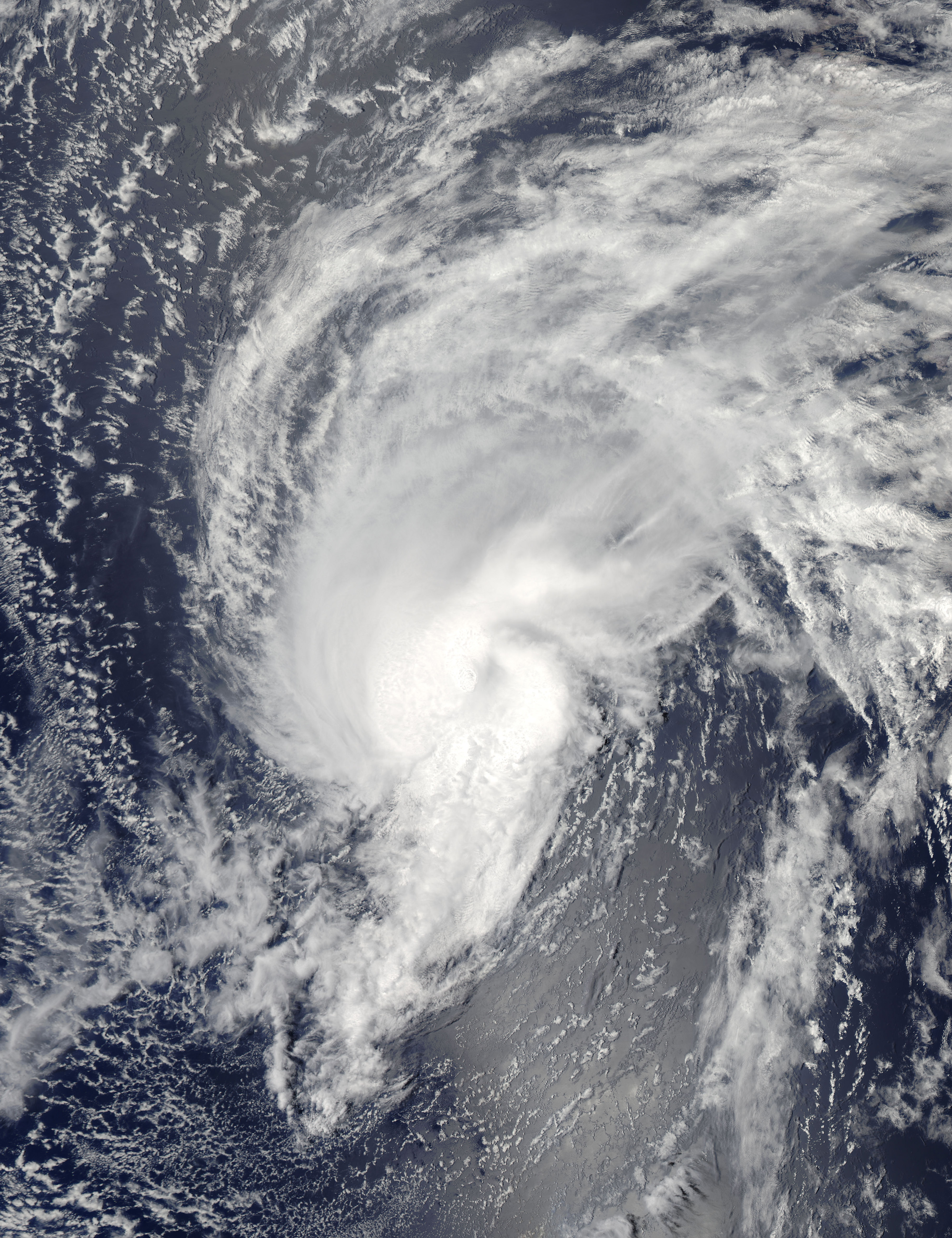
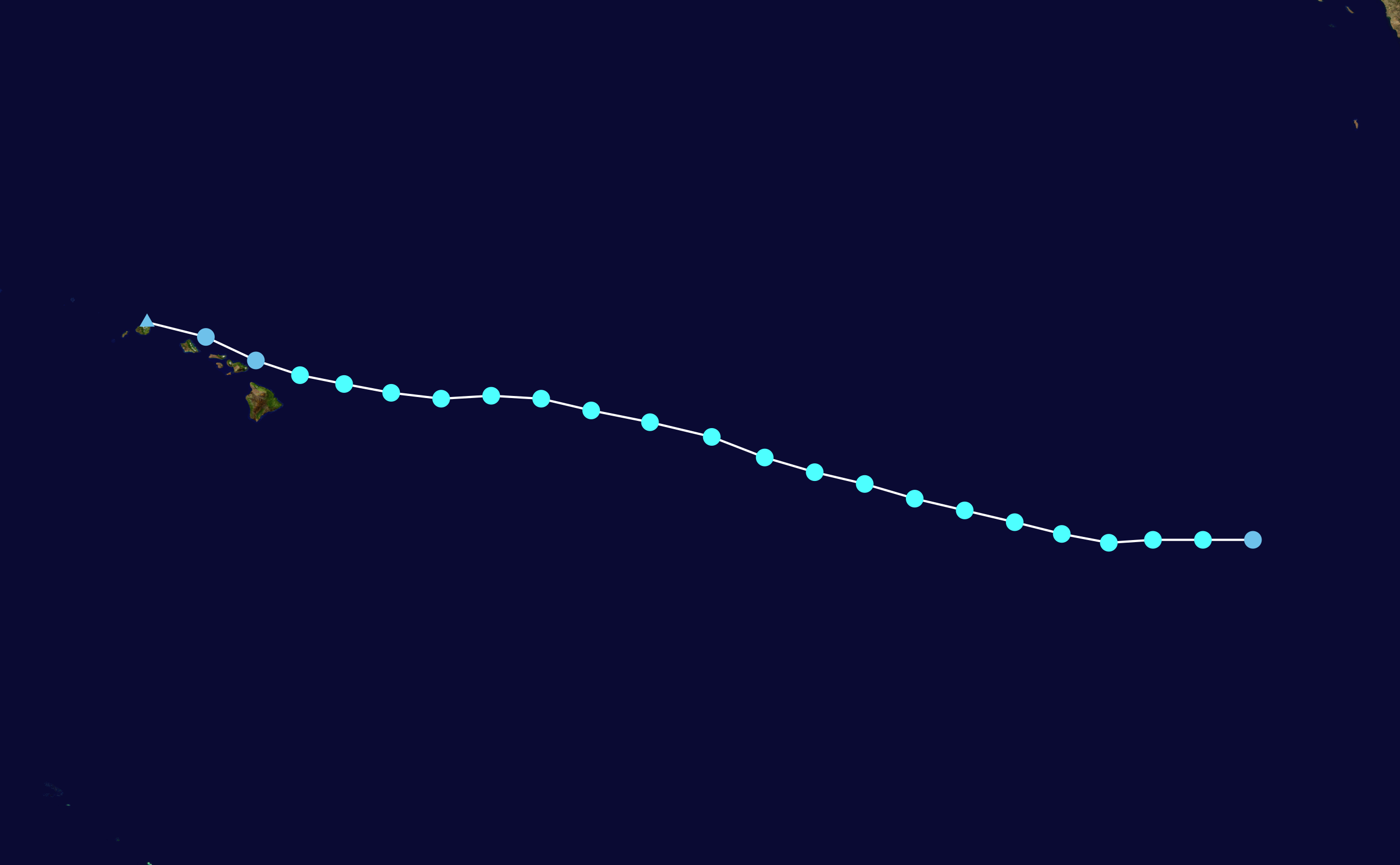
- Duration: July 25 – July 30
- Peak intensity: 70 mph (110 km/h) (1-min); 994 mbar (hPa)

A tropical wave moved off the western coast of Africa on July 9 and crossed Central America on July 18. The disturbance initially lacked a well-defined center until early on July 25 as convection steadily increased, leading the formation of a tropical depression at 00:00 UTC that day; six hours later, the depression strengthened into Tropical Storm Flossie. Steered westward amid a favorable environment, the cyclone steadily intensified, attaining peak winds of 70 mph (115 km/h) at 12:00 UTC on July 27 as an eye became evident on satellite imagery. Flossie crossed into the Central Pacific shortly thereafter, where increasing wind shear prompted a gradual weakening trend. At 00:00 UTC on July 30, the system weakened to a tropical depression; twelve hours later, it degenerated into a remnant low while located near the northern coast of Kauai.

Following Flossie's crossing into the Central Pacific Hurricane Center's warning zone, a tropical storm watch was issued for Hawaii and Maui counties on July 27. All Maui County parks were closed due to the storm as county authorities activated emergency operations. Upon becoming the first storm to directly hit the state in 20 years, gusty winds downed trees and power lines. More than 9,000 residences were without electricity across the state, with most outages concentrated in Kihei, Maui, and Puna.

=== Hurricane Gil ===
- Category 1 hurricane (SSHWS)
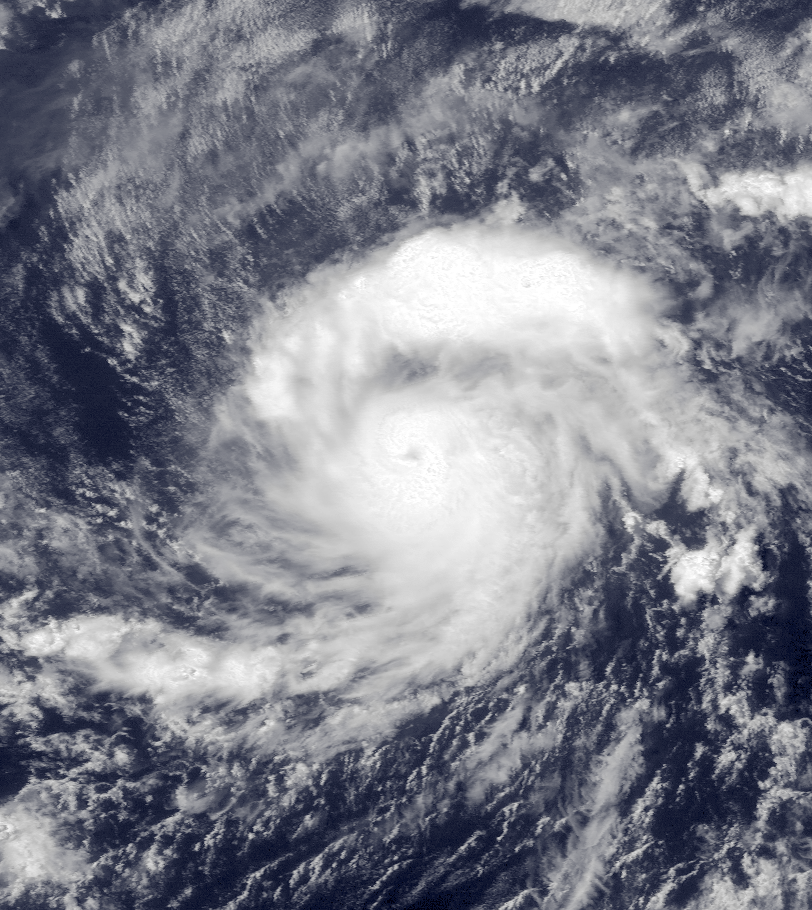
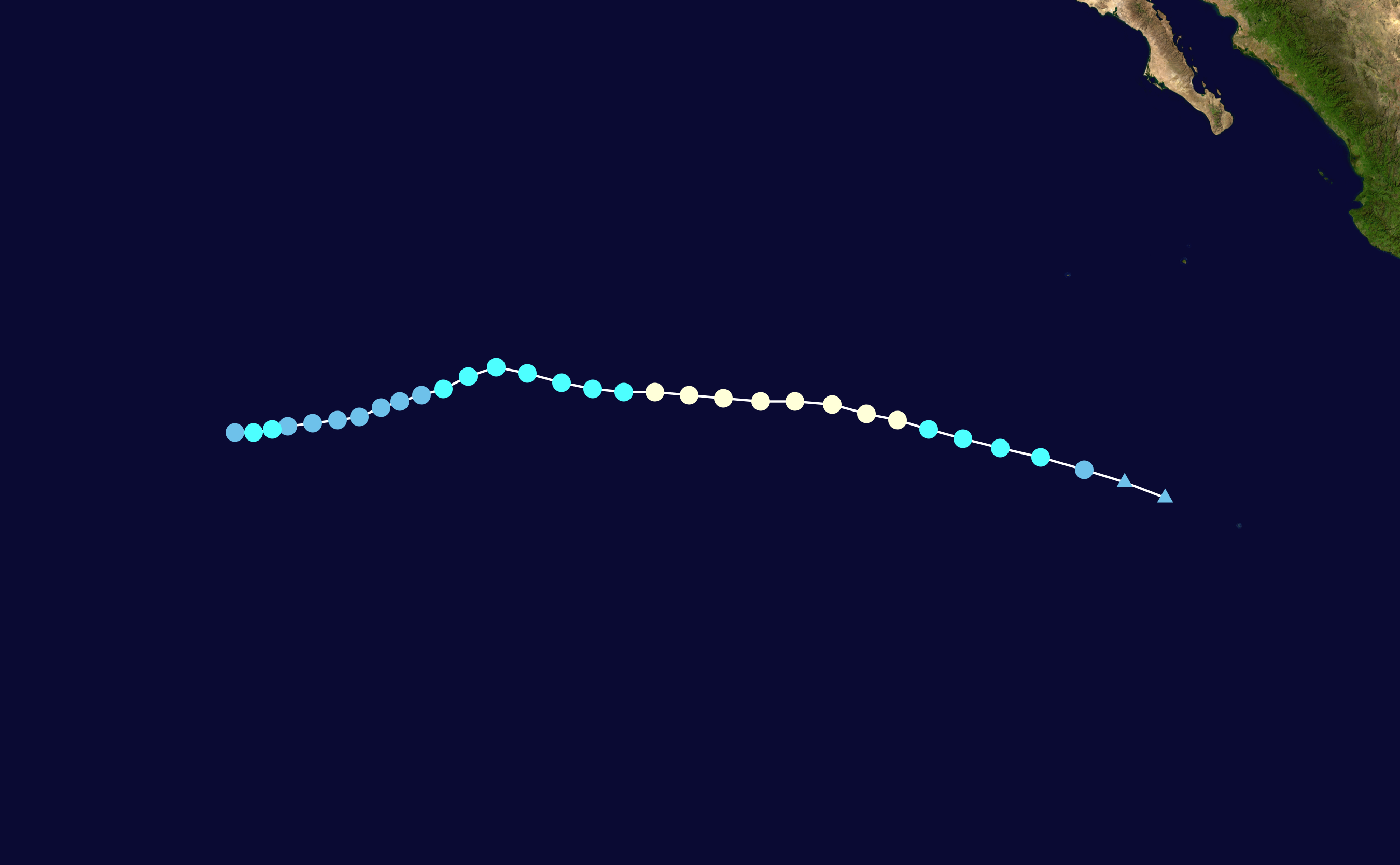
- Duration: July 30 – August 6
- Peak intensity: 85 mph (140 km/h) (1-min); 985 mbar (hPa)

The formation of Gil is attributed to a tropical wave that departed the west coast of Africa on July 16 and entered the East Pacific on July 24. Initially disheveled, the wave slowly organized as convection increased and its associated center became better defined, leading to the formation of a tropical depression at 12:00 UTC on July 30; six hours later, the depression strengthened into Tropical Storm Gil. With a small circulation, the cyclone entered a period of rapid deepening, intensifying into a Category 1 hurricane at 18:00 UTC on July 31 and attaining peak winds of 85 mph (135 km/h) a day later. Thereafter, increasing shear and drier air caused the storm to begin weakening; at 18:00 UTC on August 2, Gil weakened to a tropical storm, and two days later, it weakened further to a tropical depression. A brief burst of convection allowed the cyclone to regain tropical storm intensity at 06:00 UTC on August 6 as it crossed into the Central Pacific, but Gil quickly weakened to a tropical depression twelve hours later. At 00:00 UTC on August 7, the system degenerated into an open trough well east-southeast of the Hawaiian Islands.

=== Hurricane Henriette ===
- Category 2 hurricane (SSHWS)
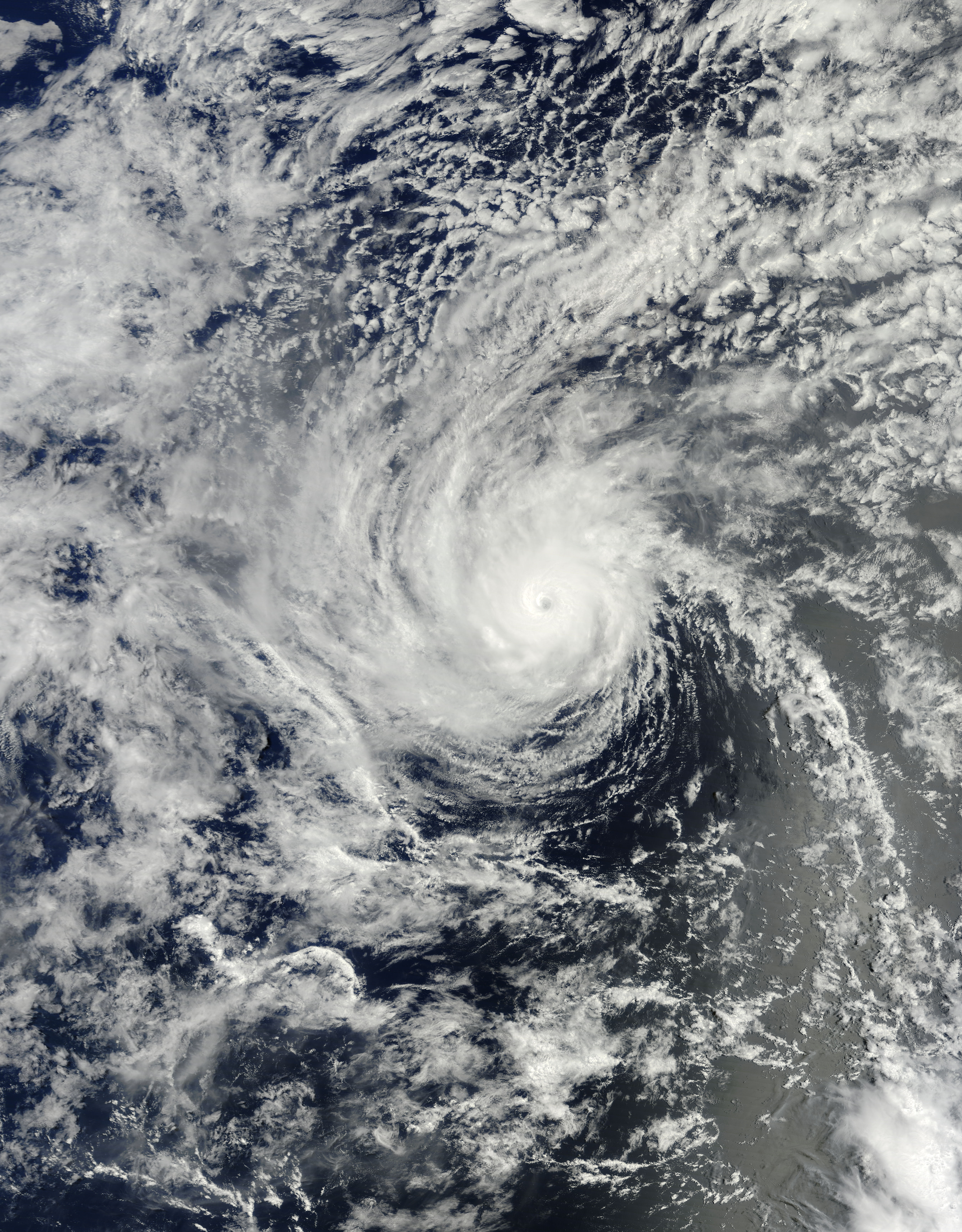
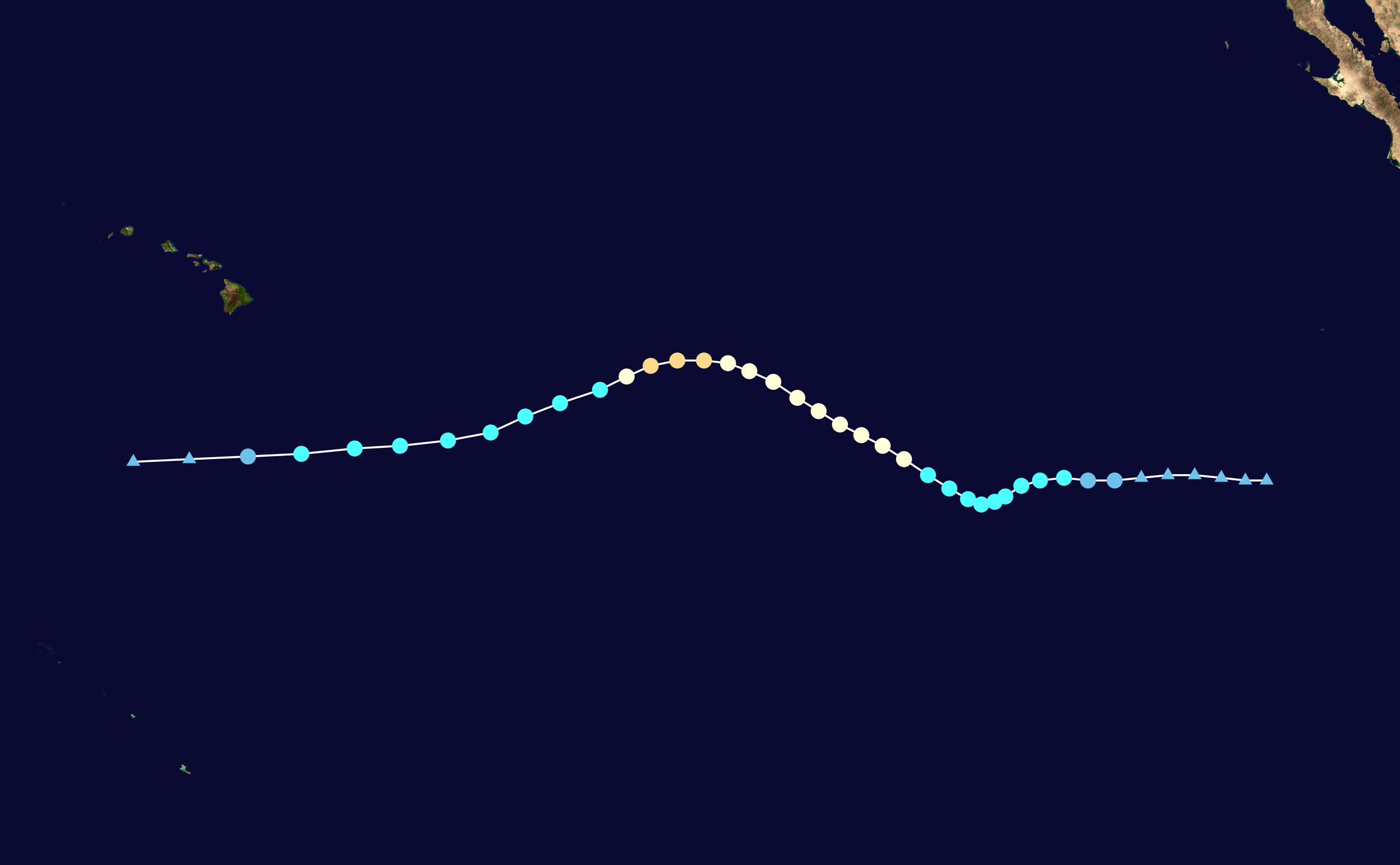
- Duration: August 3 – August 11
- Peak intensity: 105 mph (165 km/h) (1-min); 976 mbar (hPa)

A tropical wave emerged off the western coast of Africa on July 19 and reached the East Pacific on July 26. Embedded within the Intertropical Convergence Zone, convection slowly coalesced about an area of low pressure, leading to the formation of a tropical depression by 12:00 UTC on August 3; twelve hours later, the depression intensified into Tropical Storm Henriette while located about 1,800 mi (2,900 km) southwest of the southern tip of Baja California. The system initially moved west-southwest following formation, but turned toward the west-northwest as it reached the western periphery of a mid-level ridge to its north. Amid a favorable environment, Henriette steadily intensified, becoming a Category 1 hurricane by 06:00 UTC on August 6 and unexpectedly attaining peak winds of 105 mph (170 km/h) by 18:00 UTC on August 8. The hurricane quickly weakened over increasingly cool waters as it resumed its southwesterly track into the Central Pacific, weakening to a tropical storm early on August 9 and further to a tropical depression two days later. By 18:00 UTC on August 11, the effects of increasing wind shear caused Henriette to degenerate into a remnant low while positioned roughly 430 mi (690 km) south of Kailua-Kona, Hawaii. The remnant low drifted west-southwest until dissipating the next day.

=== Tropical Storm Pewa ===
- Tropical storm (SSHWS)
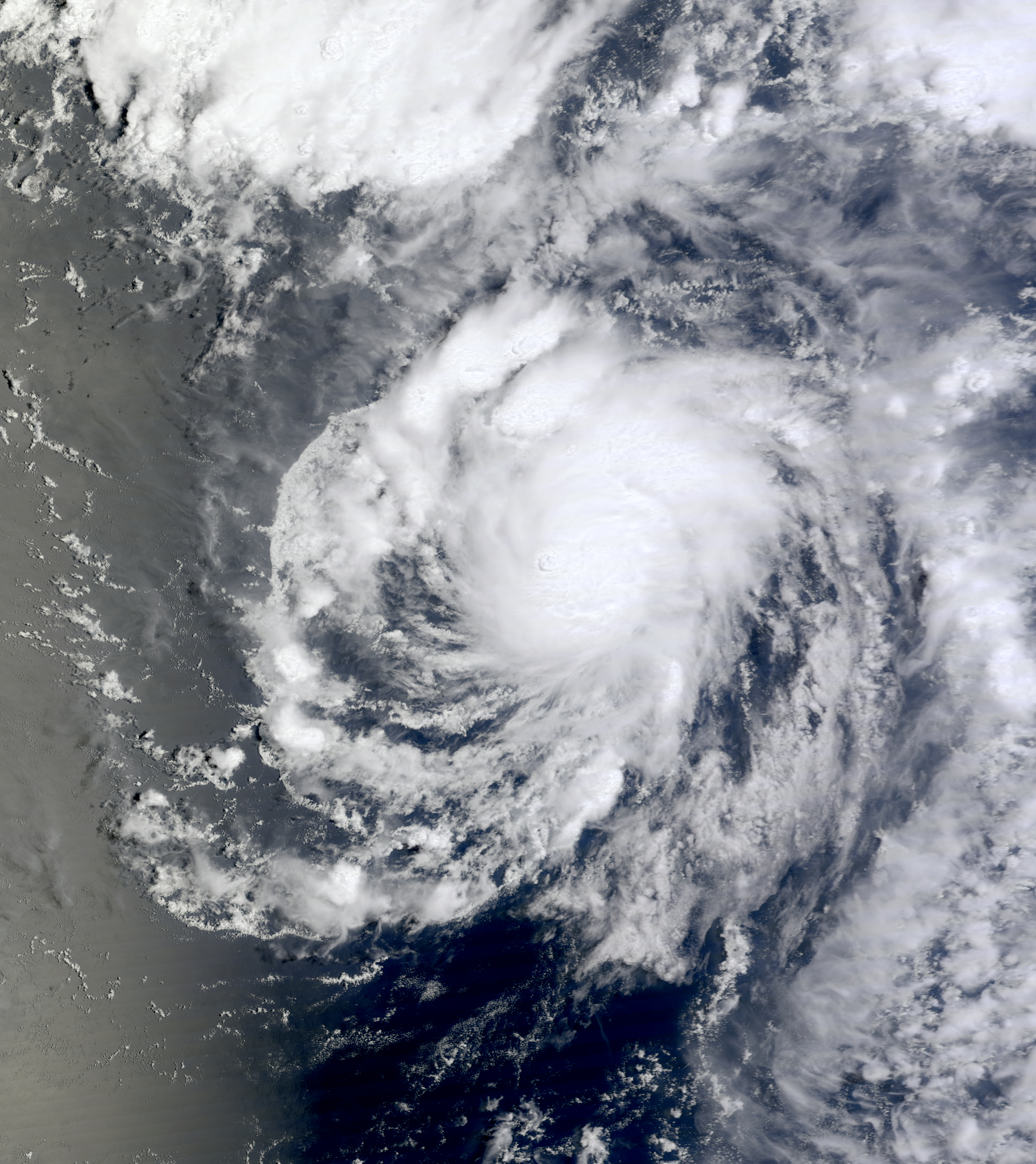
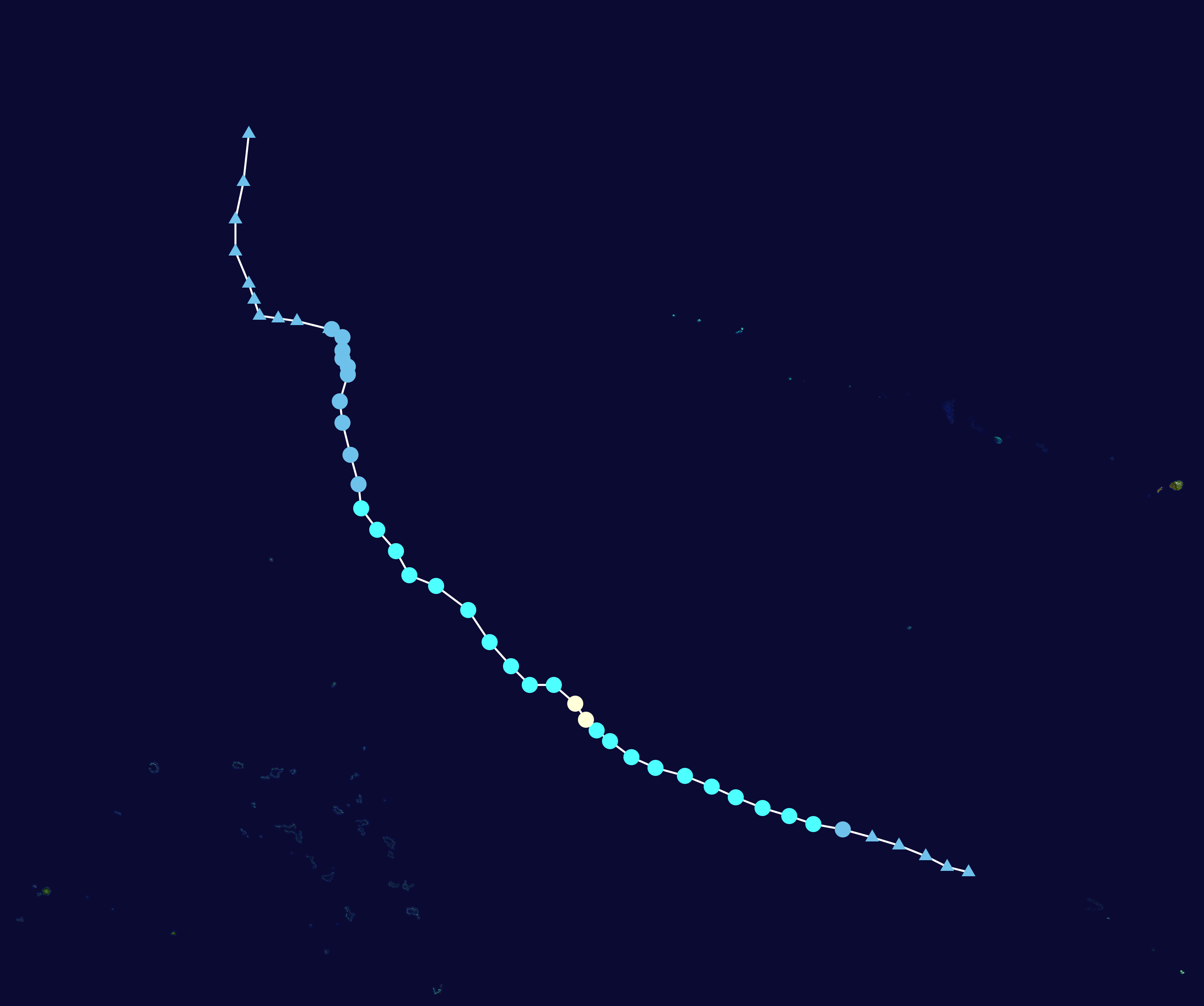
- Duration: August 16 – August 18 (Exited basin)
- Peak intensity: 65 mph (100 km/h) (1-min); 1000 mbar (hPa)

A broad trough was first identified west of Central America in early August. This trough drifted westward to the south of the Hawaiian Islands by August 14, where it yielded three defined areas of disturbed weather. Largely devoid of convection initially, the westernmost disturbance steadily organized over the coming days, leading to the formation of a tropical depression by 06:00 UTC on August 16; six hours later, the depression intensified into Tropical Storm Pewa. The cyclone tracked west-northwest following formation, steered by a mid-level ridge to its north. Pewa crossed the International Date Line into the West Pacific on August 18, where it would later become a typhoon before succumbing to unfavorable wind shear.

=== Tropical Storm Unala ===
- Tropical storm (SSHWS)
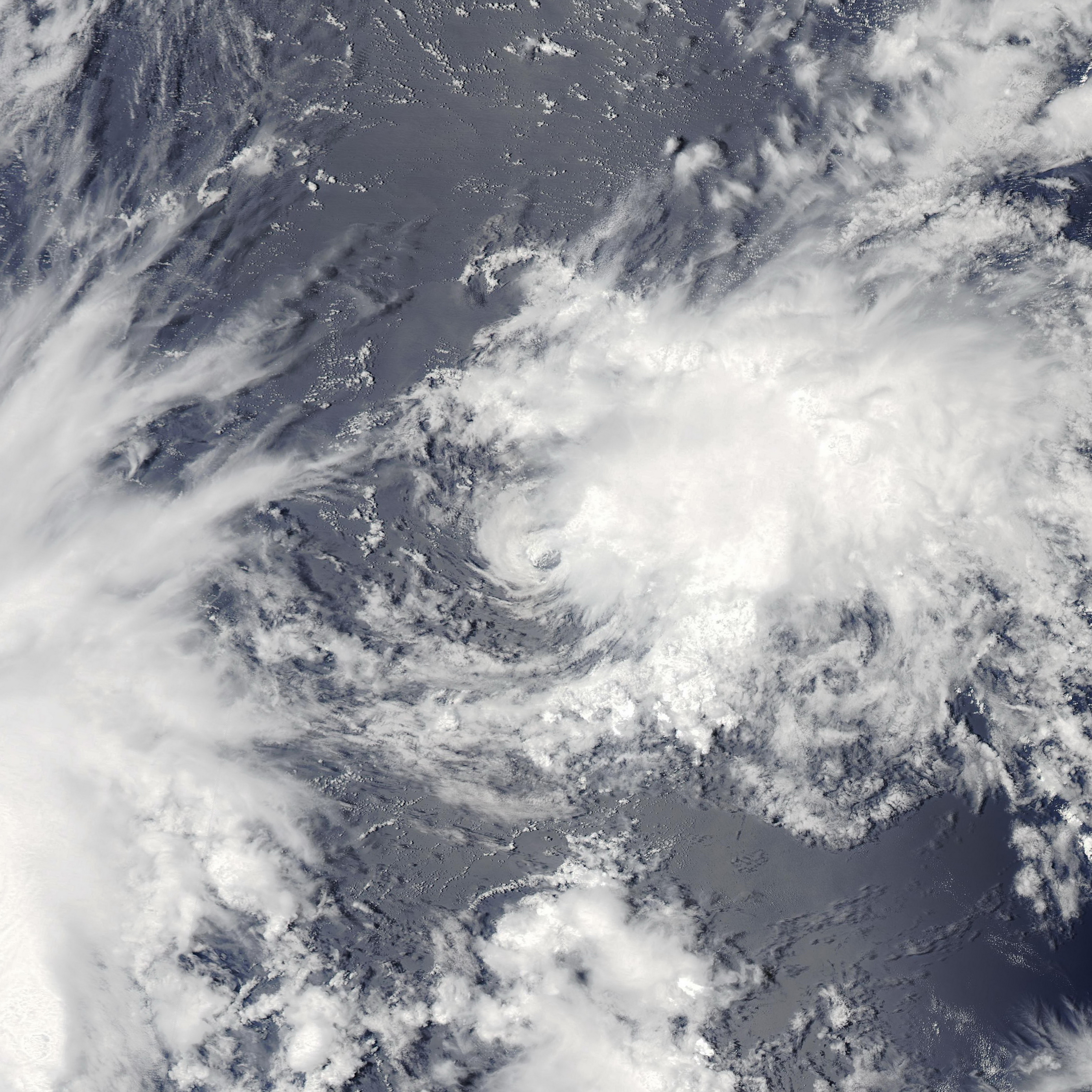
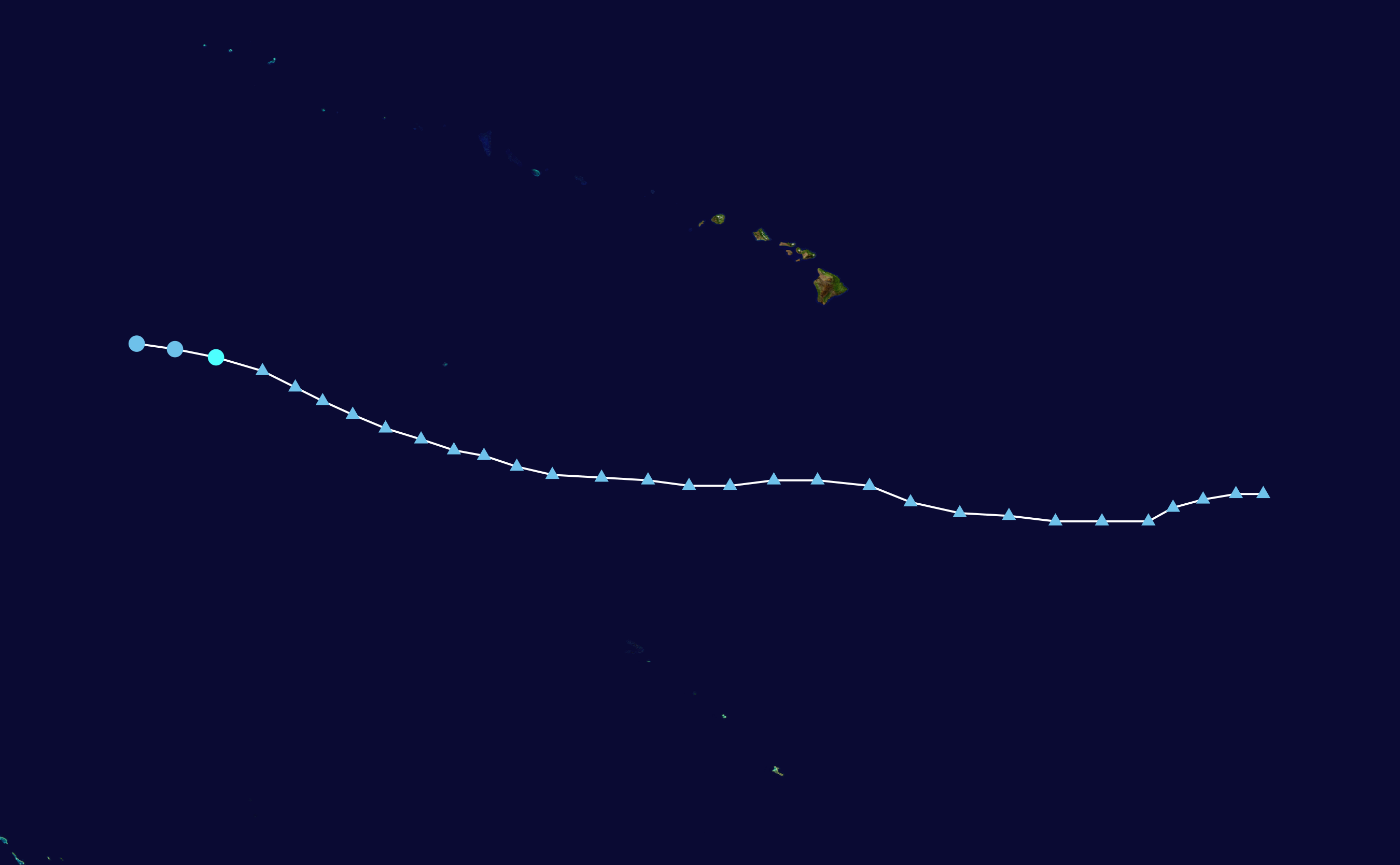
- Duration: August 19 – August 19 (Exited basin)
- Peak intensity: 40 mph (65 km/h) (1-min); 1005 mbar (hPa)

On August 10, the CPHC began monitoring a trough located roughly 1,300 mi (2,100 km) east-southeast of the Big Island of Hawaii for potential development. Disorganized convective activity developed in association with the trough as it moved generally westward. By August 13, multiple areas of vorticity formed within the disturbance, hindering its development into a coherent cyclone. Marginally favorable environmental conditions allowed for some organization on August 15. Following an increase strong thunderstorms around the center, the CPHC stated that it was becoming a tropical depression. However, outflow from a nearby disturbance, which would soon become Tropical Storm Pewa, disrupted the system and caused it to become more disorganized. Late on August 19 the depression strengthened into a tropical storm. However, outflow from the nearby Typhoon Pewa caused an increase in wind shear over the system, causing Unala to become disorganized and weaken. By this time the system has crossed into the Western Pacific basin. During the afternoon of August 19, the depression had dissipated completely, as it was being absorbed by Pewa.

=== Tropical Depression Three-C ===
- Tropical depression (SSHWS)
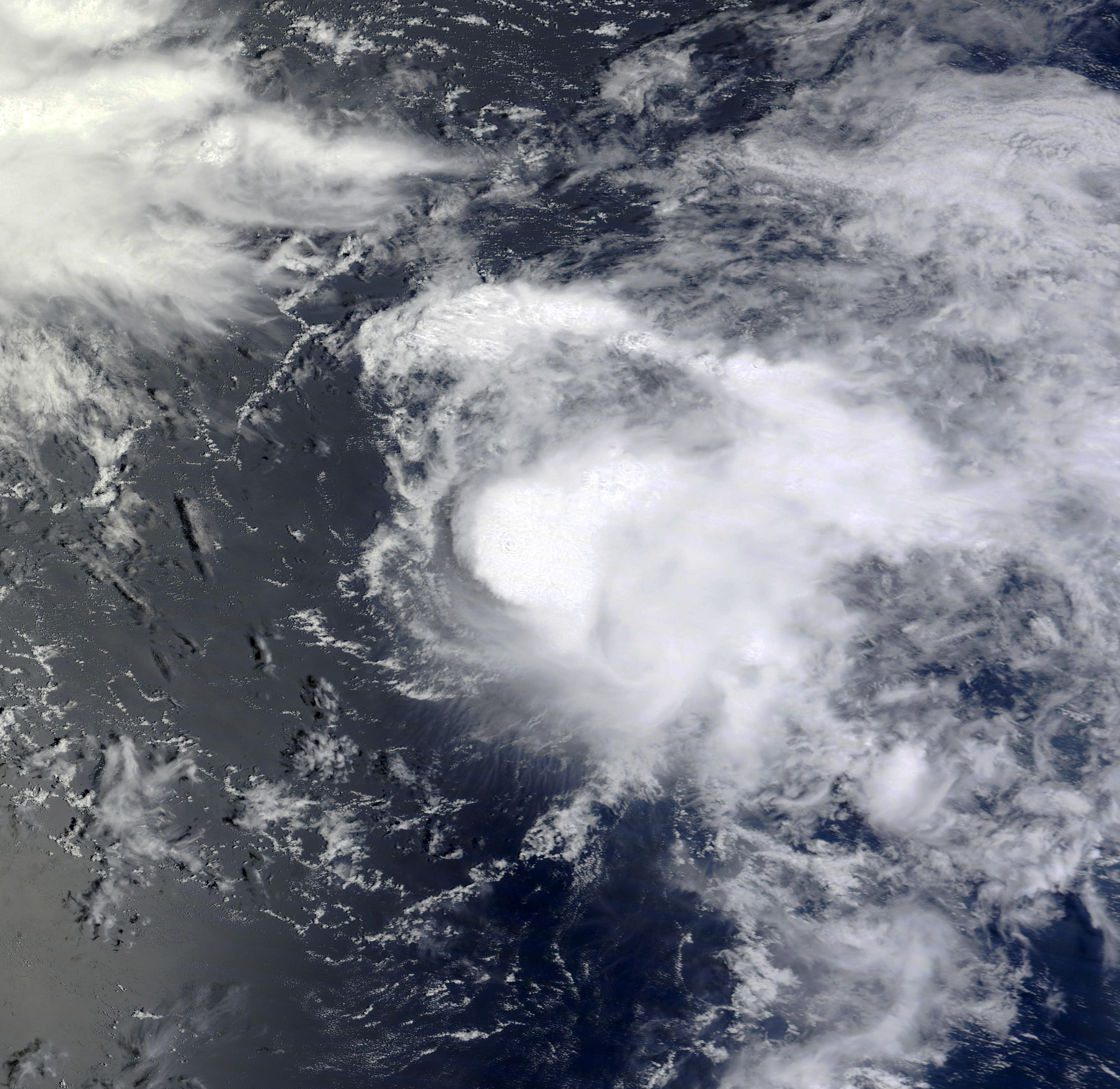
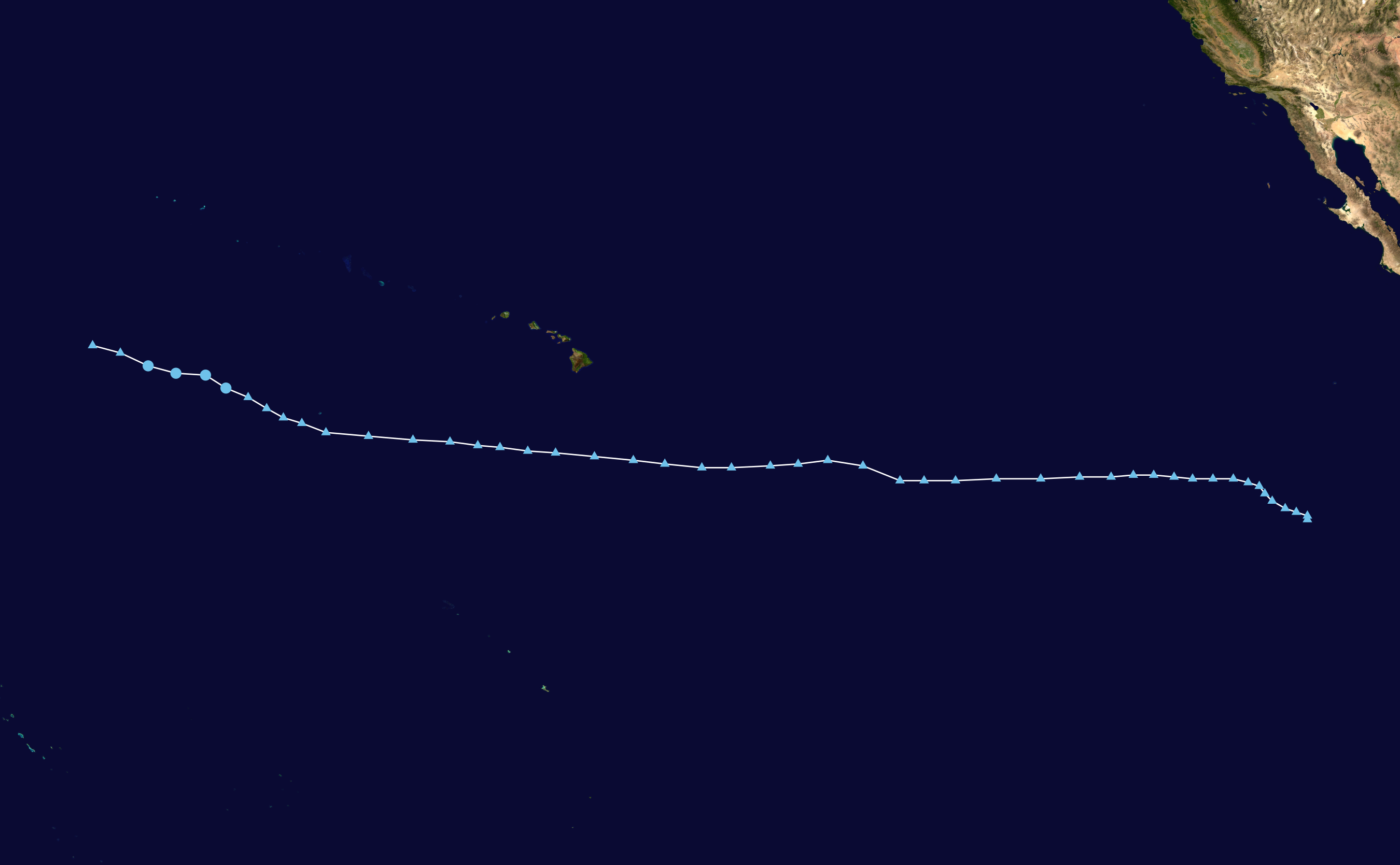
- Duration: August 19 – August 20 (Exited basin)
- Peak intensity: 35 mph (55 km/h) (1-min); 1008 mbar (hPa)

The third in a trio of Central Pacific tropical cyclones was first monitored by the NHC on August 9. The disturbance formed a weak surface low three days later but ultimately opened into a trough as it entered the CPHC's area of responsibility on August 14. There, steady organization led to the formation of a tropical depression around 18:00 UTC on August 19. Upper-level outflow from nearby Tropical Storm Pewa imparted shear on the newly formed system, and it failed to attain tropical storm strength, instead crossing the International Date Line as a tropical depression on August 20 and dissipating the next day.

=== Tropical Storm Ivo ===
- Tropical storm (SSHWS)
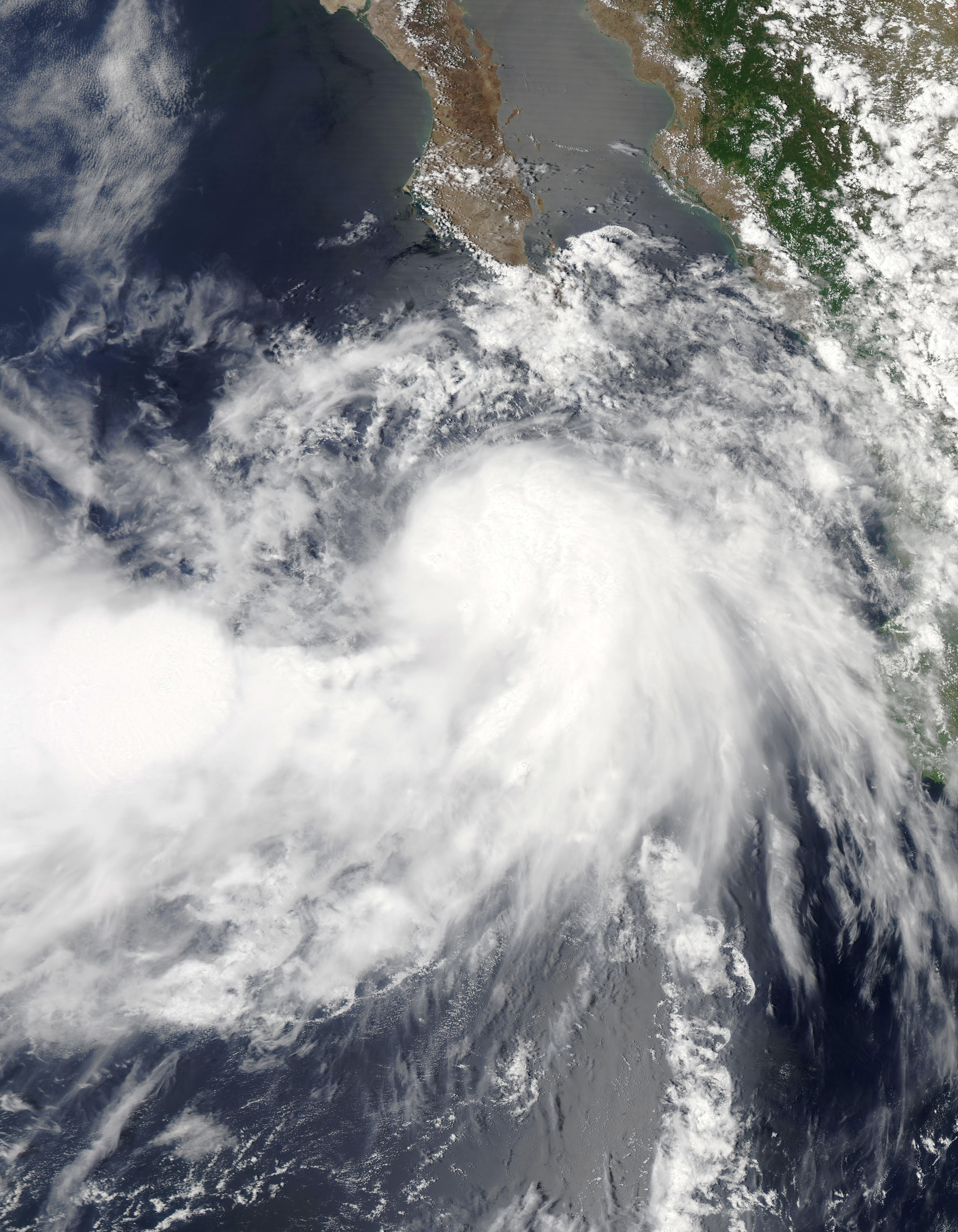
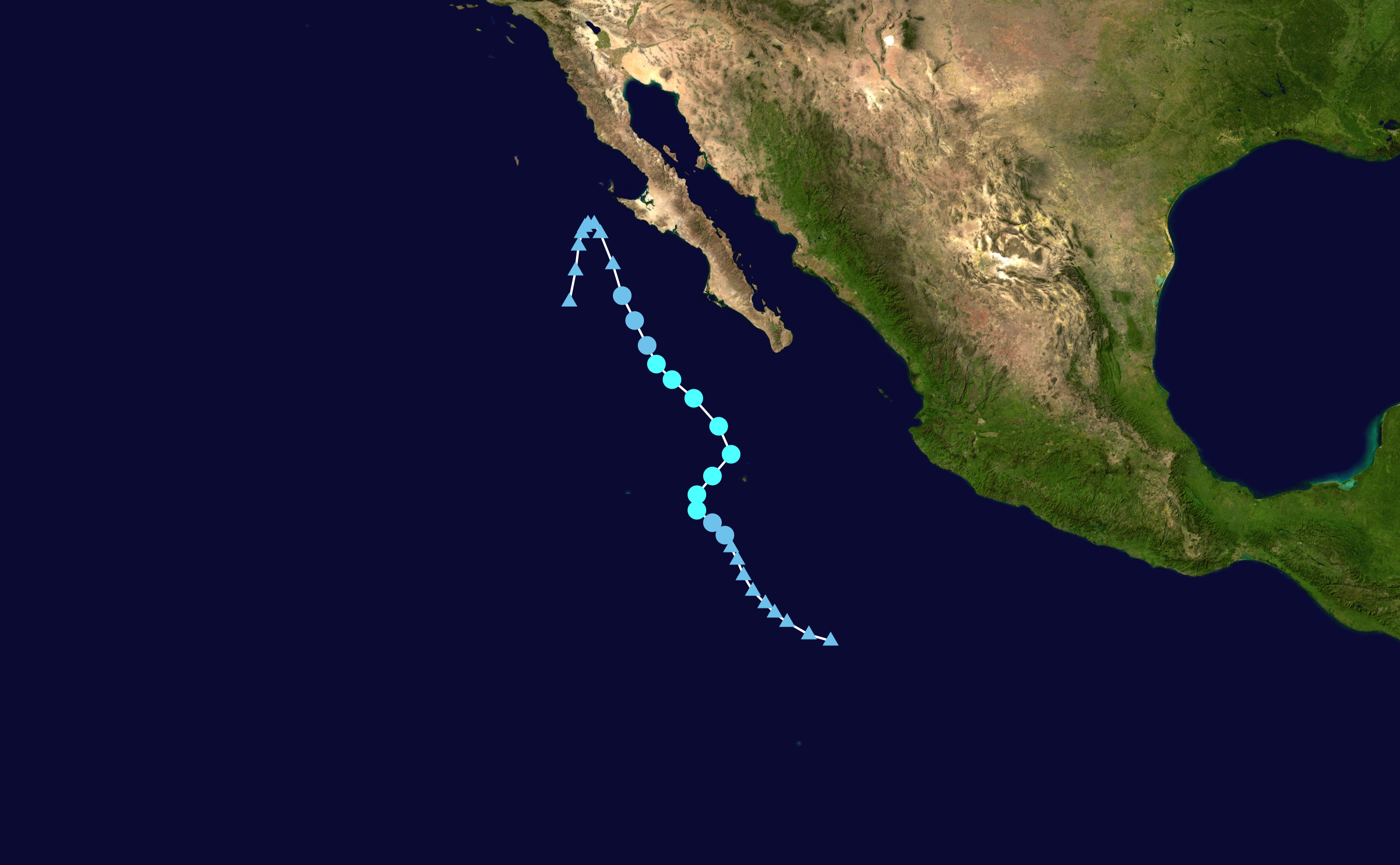
- Duration: August 22 – August 25
- Peak intensity: 45 mph (75 km/h) (1-min); 997 mbar (hPa)

The southern portion of a tropical wave entered the East Pacific on August 15. Although moderate shear initially hindered the organization of convection, a broad low- to mid-level circulation formed and steadily coalesced. Upper-level winds lessened on August 22 as the disturbance turned northwestward, leading to the formation of a tropical depression by 12:00 UTC. Following designation, the depression began to interact with a tropical wave to its east, ultimately leading to an abrupt center formation to the northeast. By 00:00 UTC on August 23, the cyclone intensified into Tropical Storm Ivo. Resuming its northwest track around a mid-level ridge across the central United States and Mexico, Ivo attained peak winds of 45 mph (70 km/h) before crossing a sharp sea surface temperature gradient. The system weakened to a tropical depression by 00:00 UTC on August 25 and further degenerated into a remnant low by 18:00 UTC on August 25 while located less than 115 mi (185 km) west of the west-central coast of the Baja California peninsula. The remnant low drifted slowly south-southwestward before dissipating early on August 28.

When the system first posed a threat to the Baja California Peninsula, a "green alert" was declared for Socorro Island and Baja California Sur. At 21:00 UTC on August 23, a tropical storm warning was issued from Punta Abreojos to Loreto, including Cabo San Lucas. A tropical storm watch was placed for the Baja California Peninsula from Punta Abreojos to Punta Eugenia. Seven ports in Baja California Sur were closed. Along the peninsula, 6,000 people were affected and many highways were damaged. Water supply was cut off to Loreto. In all, 400 people were evacuated and 200 homes were flooded. Six people were injured, including two serious. Damages in Baja California totaled to MXN$1.126 billion (USD$88.3 million). In the United States, flash flood watches were issued for Pima County, extending westward across western Arizona and into Southern Nevada. Several roads were closed in Yuma County. In East County, many roads were flooded. Elsewhere, Borrego Springs saw 3 inches (76 mm) of rain in less than an hour, resulting in flash flooding, which stranded motorists. Several mudslides were also reported in San Bernardino County. One person drowned in Needles after flood waters overwhelmed her vehicle; 18 swift water rescues were made in the same area. Heavy rains in Nevada, amounting to nearly 4 in (100 mm) at Mount Charleston, caused significant flooding; damage in the Las Vegas Valley reached $300,000. Widespread flooding occurred around Zion National Park.

=== Tropical Storm Juliette ===
- Tropical storm (SSHWS)
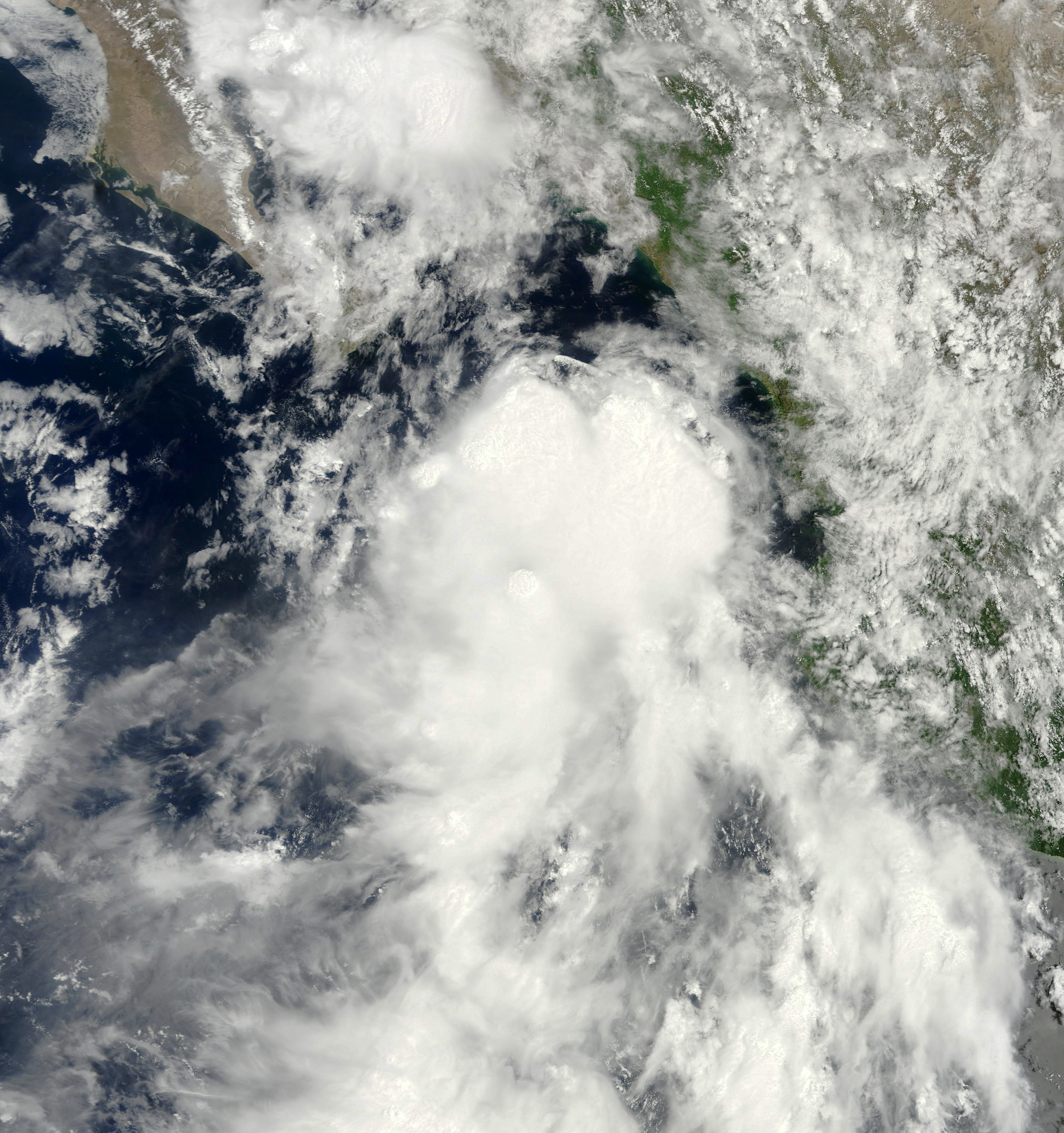
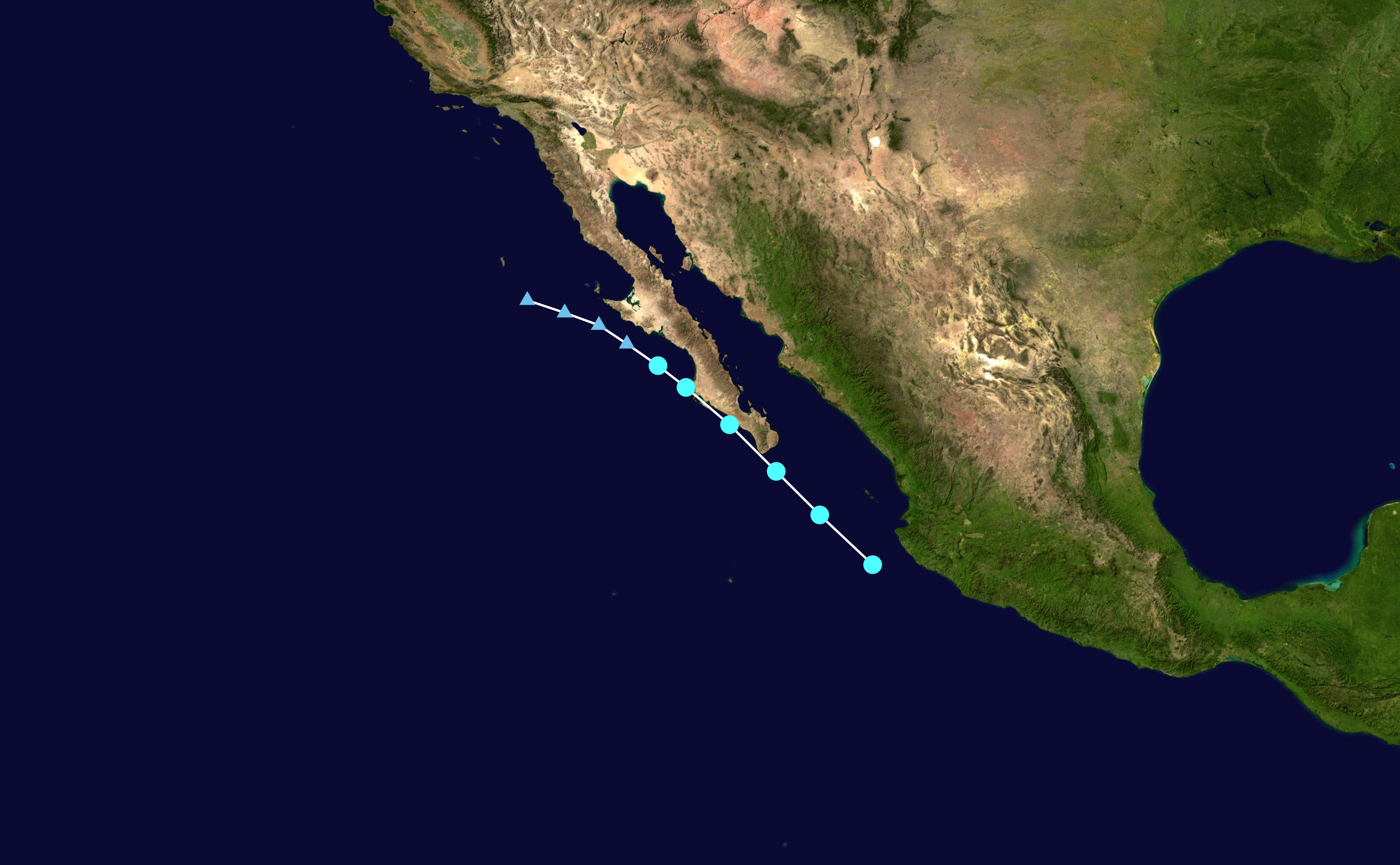
- Duration: August 28 – August 29
- Peak intensity: 65 mph (100 km/h) (1-min); 997 mbar (hPa)

An area of convection occurred on August 25. It was classified as a disturbance the next day. Late on August 27, the disturbance entered warm waters as it became Tropical Depression Ten-E. Due to warm waters and windshear, Ten-E intensified into Tropical Storm Juliette late on August 28. As Juliette races towards northwest, it reached peak intensity and then rapidly weakened to a depression on August 29. The NHC issued its final advisories later that day while Juliette's remnants continued to move west, with its circulation dissipating very early on August 31.

Upon formation, a "green alert" was issued for Sonora, the northern portion of the Baja California Peninsula, Jalisco, Nayarit, and Socorro Island, while a "blue alert" was issued for Baja California Sur and Colima. Six shelters opened for in San José del Cabo and Cabo San Lucas and were used by 164 residents, though many refused to go. Much of Baja California Sur briefly lost power, including the communities of Todos Santos and Pescadero, and portions of Cabo San Lucas and San José del Cabo. Furthermore, one man was electrocuted and later died. One home was destroyed. A total of 1,600 persons spent the night in a shelter. However, there were no reports of significant damages from the storm.

=== Hurricane Kiko ===
- Category 1 hurricane (SSHWS)
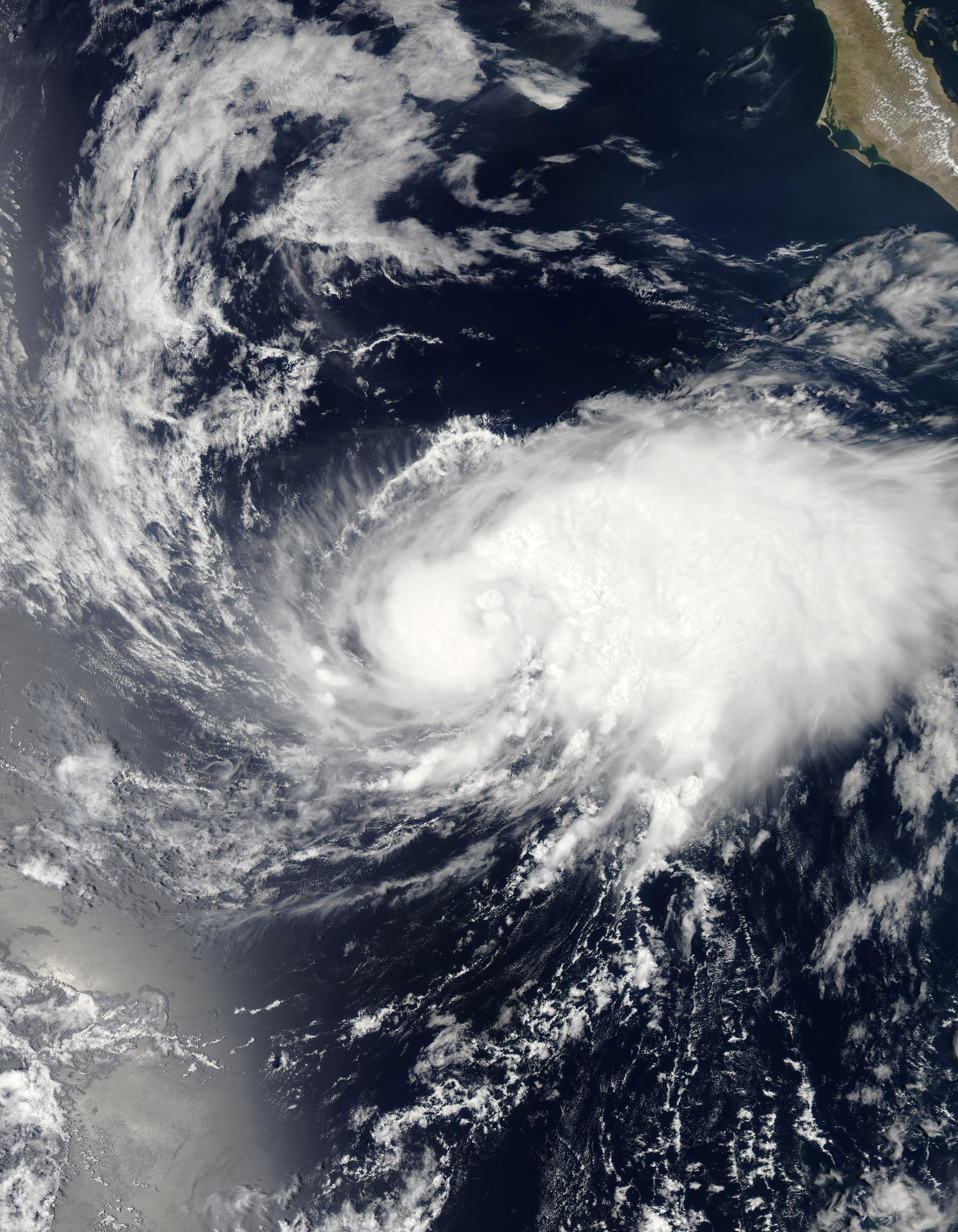
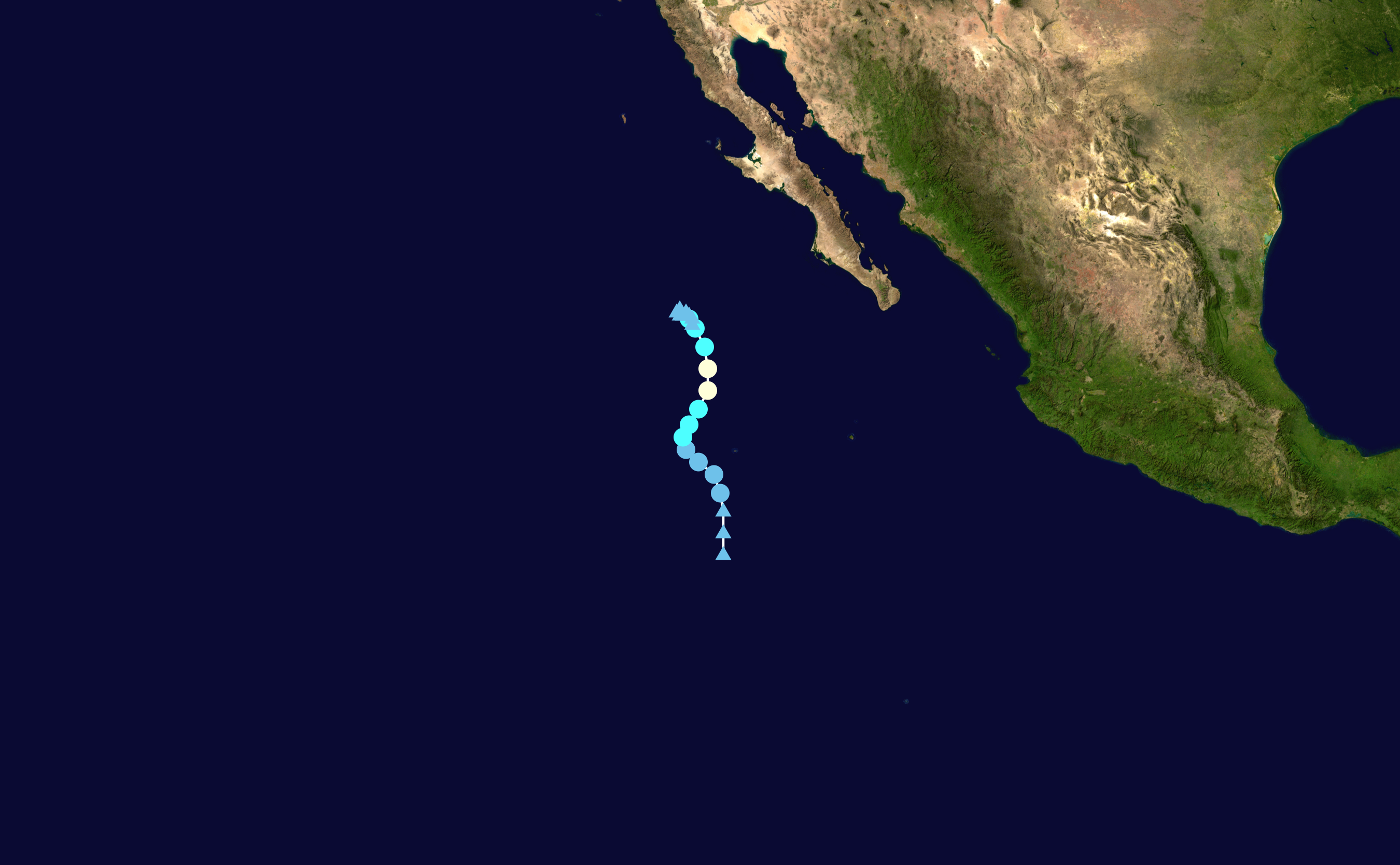
- Duration: August 30 – September 2
- Peak intensity: 75 mph (120 km/h) (1-min); 989 mbar (hPa)

On August 28, a trough within the ITCZ was first identified well south-southwest of the southern tip of Baja California. That day, an area of low pressure formed along the trough and tracked northwest. A tropical wave, one responsible for the development of tropical storms Erin and Fernand in the Atlantic, and Tropical Storm Juliette in the East Pacific, bypassed the low on August 30, leading to an increase in convection and the formation of a tropical depression by 12:00 UTC that day. The depression initially strengthened slowly under the influence of moderate northerly wind shear, becoming a tropical storm by 12:00 UTC on August 31. Thereafter, upper-level winds became more conducive as the system turned north-northeast, and Kiko began a period of rapid deepening yielding peak winds of 75 mph (120 km/h) by 06:00 UTC on September 1. Following peak, an increase in wind shear and track over cooler waters led to a weakening trend. Kiko deteriorated into a tropical storm by 18:00 UTC and further degenerated into a remnant low by 12:00 UTC on September 2. The remnant low executed a cyclonic loop and tracked southeast before dissipating on September 4.

=== Tropical Storm Lorena ===
- Tropical storm (SSHWS)
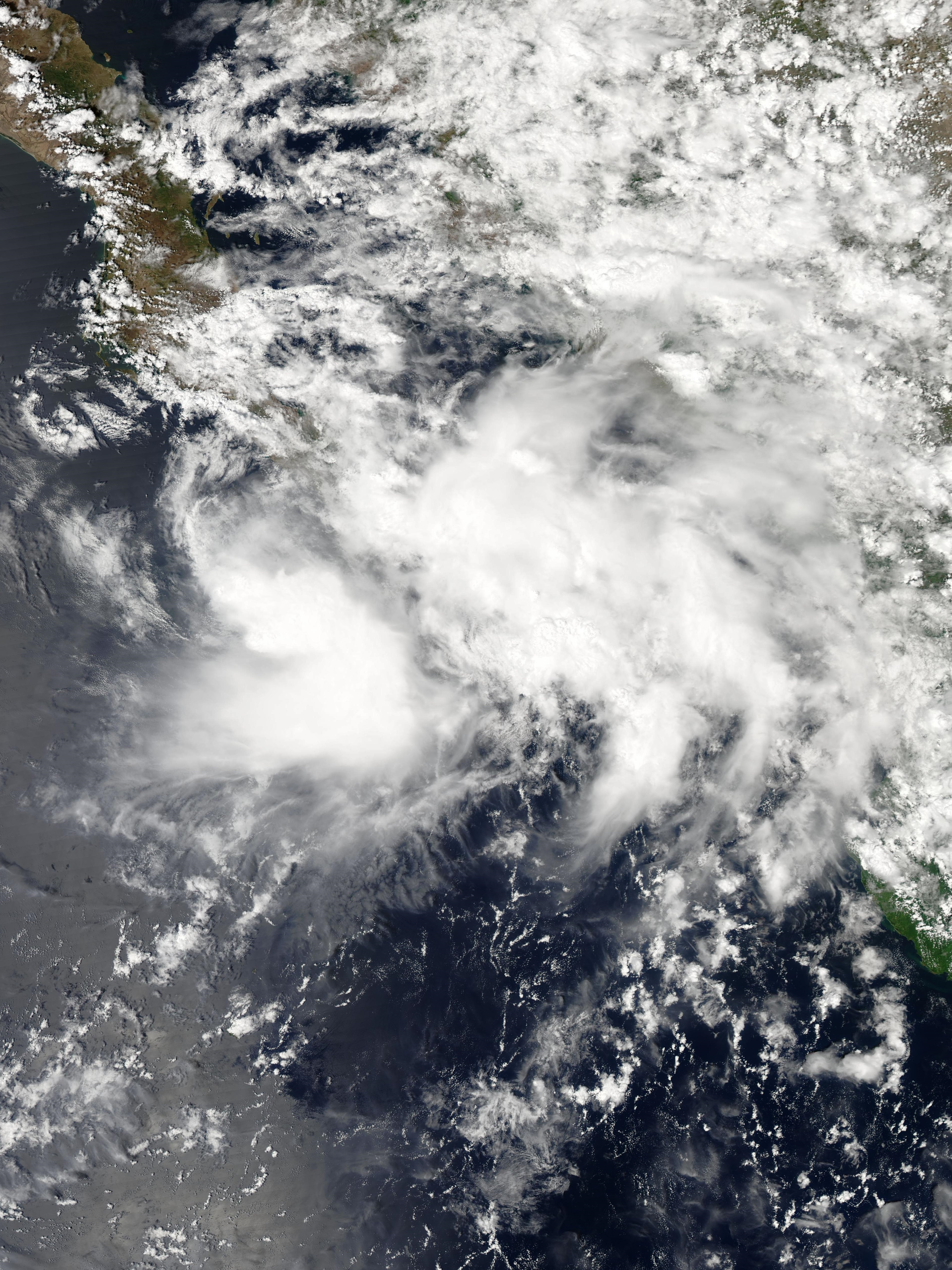
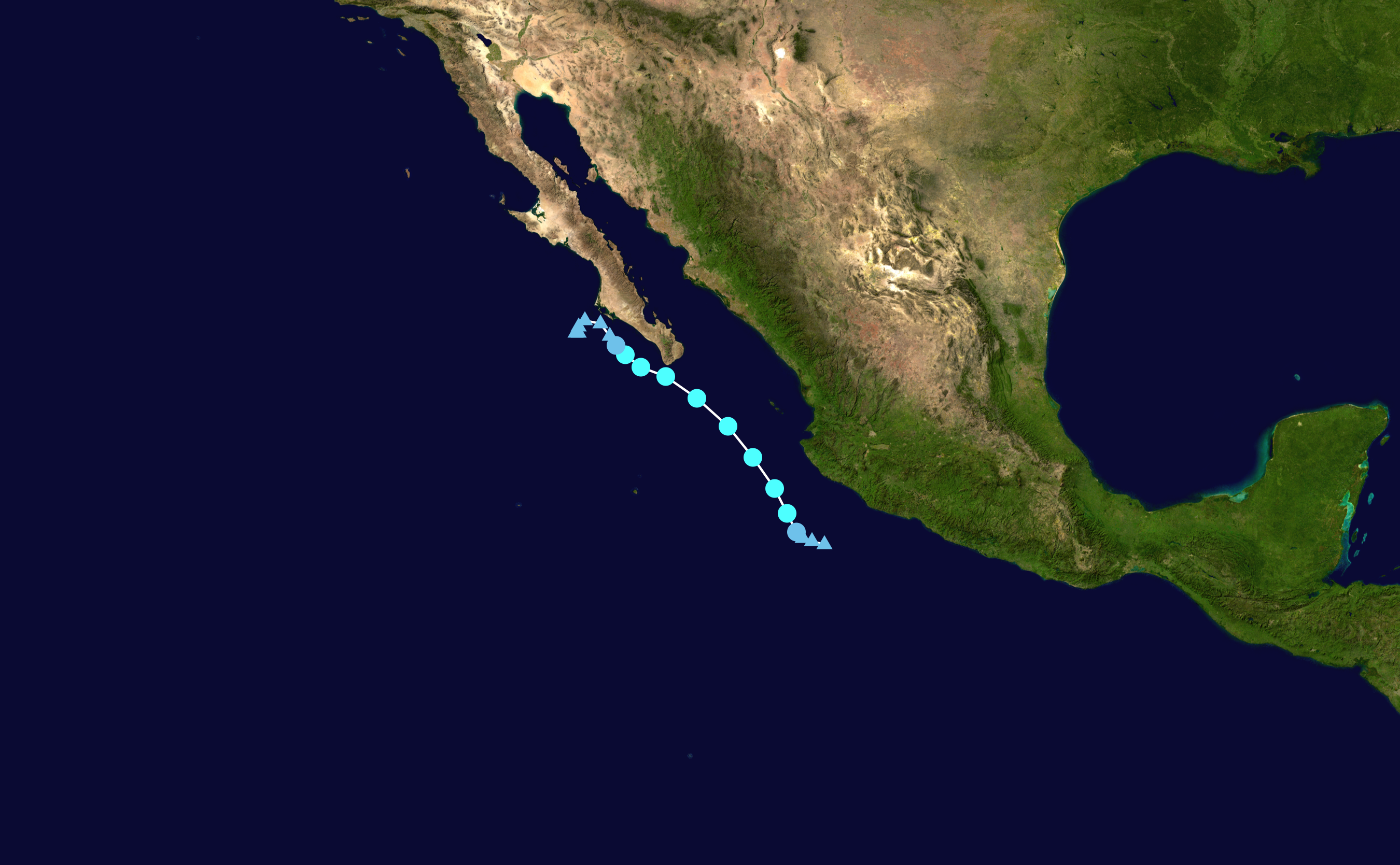
- Duration: September 5 – September 7
- Peak intensity: 50 mph (85 km/h) (1-min); 1002 mbar (hPa)

The formation of Lorena is attributed to a tropical wave first identified over Central America on August 31. The wave moved slowly across the East Pacific for several days while remaining disorganized. However, by 06:00 UTC on September 5, the disturbance acquired sufficient organization to be declared a tropical depression; six hours later, the depression intensified into Tropical Storm Lorena. Steered northwest around a mid-level ridge over Mexico, an elongation of the low-level center, separation of the low and mid-level centers, and light to moderate southwesterly shear prompted only gradual strengthening, and Lorena attained peak winds of 50 mph (80 km/h) on September 6. Thereafter, the introduction of dry and stable air caused the cyclone to become disheveled as associated convection dissipated. Lorena weakened to a tropical depression at 12:00 UTC on September 7 and degenerated into a remnant low six hours later while located 60 mi (95 km) west-southwest of Santa Fe, Mexico. The low turned west and south before opening up into a trough early on September 9.

Upon becoming a tropical cyclone, a "yellow alert" was issued for Colima and Nayarit. A "green alert" was issued for Socorro Island, Michoacán, and Jalisco while a "blue alert" was in effect for Baja California Sur and Sinaloa. Classes were suspended for Los Cabos. The ports of Mazatlán, La Paz, Cabo San Lucas, Los Barriles, and San José del Cabo were closed because of high waves. Lorena brought moderate rain over the peninsula. However, there were no reports of significant damages from the storm in Baja California. The remnants of Lorena caused flash flooding in Arizona, causing minor damage to homes and vehicles. Damage in Arizona is estimated at USD$25,000.

=== Hurricane Manuel ===
- Category 1 hurricane (SSHWS)
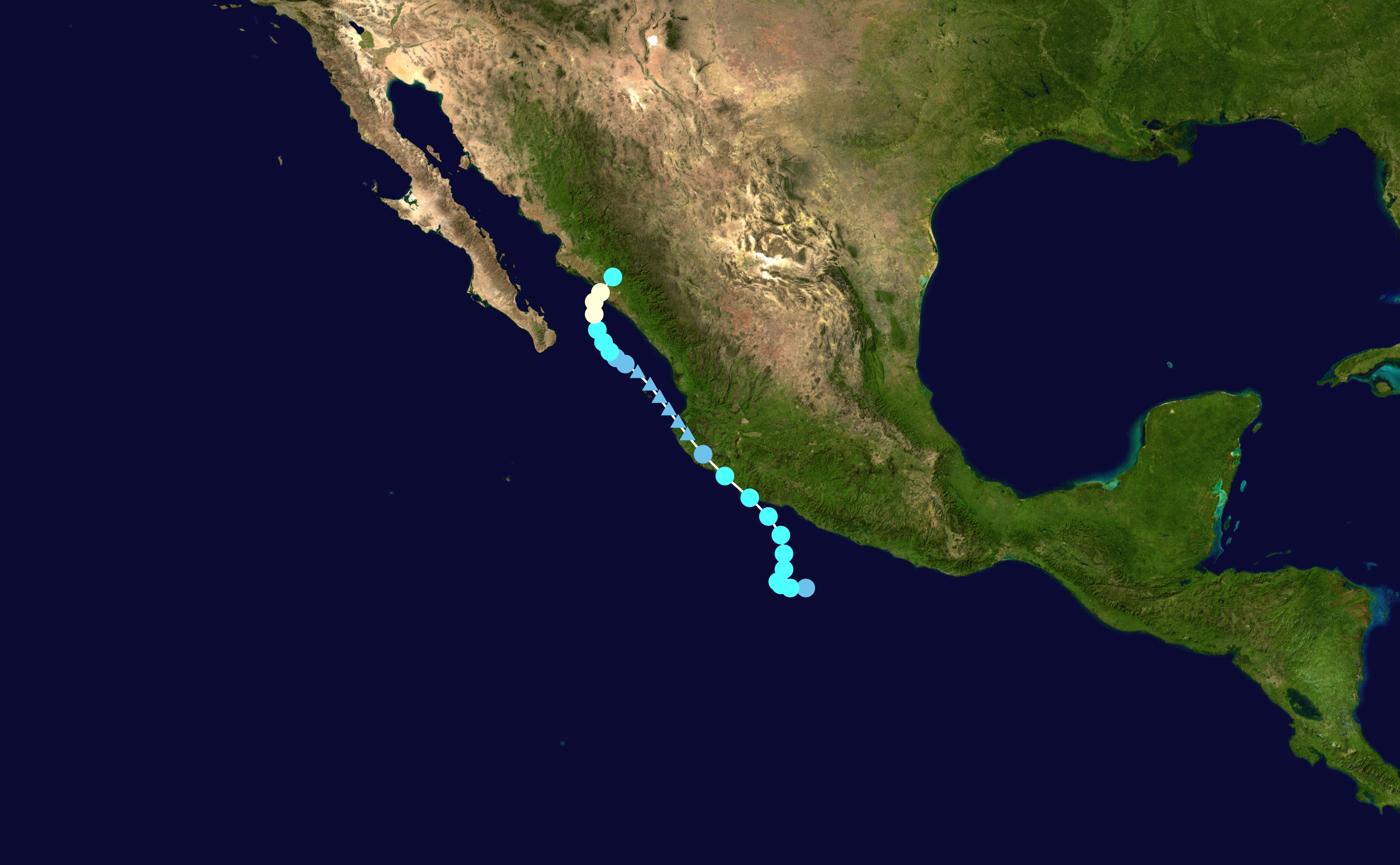
- Duration: September 13 – September 19
- Peak intensity: 75 mph (120 km/h) (1-min); 983 mbar (hPa)

On September 13, a tropical depression formed off the southwest coast of Mexico from a tropical wave that entered the basin two days earlier. Six hours later, it intensified into Tropical Storm Manuel while moving northwestward. The storm turned to the north on September 14 as a mid-level ridge over central Mexico weakened. By 06:00 UTC on September 14, Manuel initially attained peak winds of 70 mph (115 km/h), which it maintained upon moving ashore near Pichilinguillo, Mexico six hours later. Once inland, Manuel weakened quickly over the high terrain of Mexico, degenerating into a weak trough by 06:00 UTC on September 16. The remnant mid-level center and trough continued to the northwest around the ridge, emerging into the Gulf of California during the afternoon of September 16. After the convection reorganized, Manuel reformed into a tropical depression about 175 mi (280 km) east of Cabo San Lucas, Mexico. Within an environment exceptionally conducive for intensification, Manuel began a period of rapid deepening, becoming a tropical storm for a second time by 06:00 UTC on September 18 and a Category 1 hurricane by 00:00 UTC on September 19. Twelve hours later, the system made landfall near Culiacán, Mexico with peak winds of 75 mph (120 km/h). Manuel quickly weakened as it once again passed over the higher terrain of Mexico, becoming a tropical storm by 18:00 UTC and further degenerating into a broad area of low pressure over the Sierra Madre Occidental mountain range by 00:00 UTC on September 20.

=== Tropical Storm Narda ===
- Tropical storm (SSHWS)
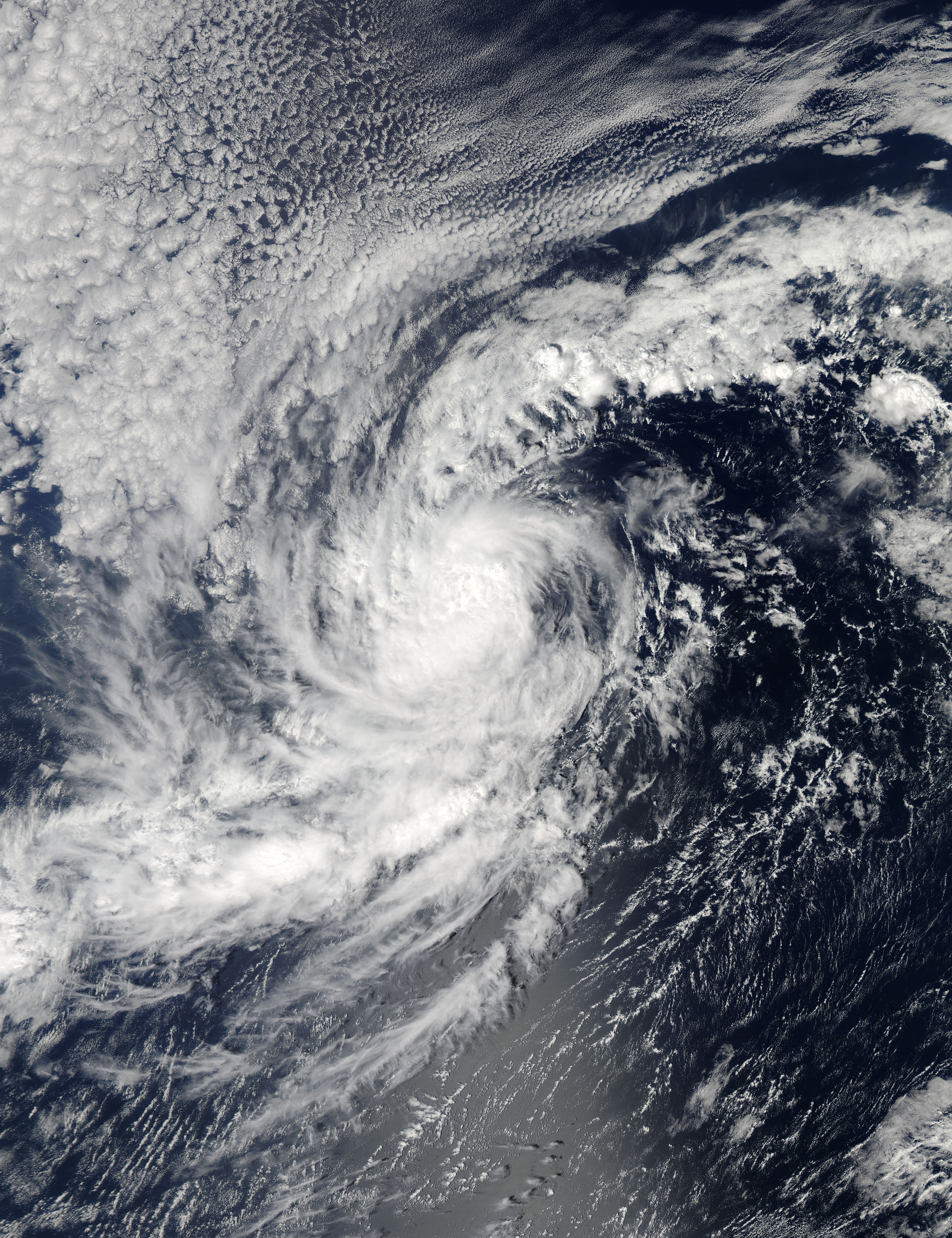
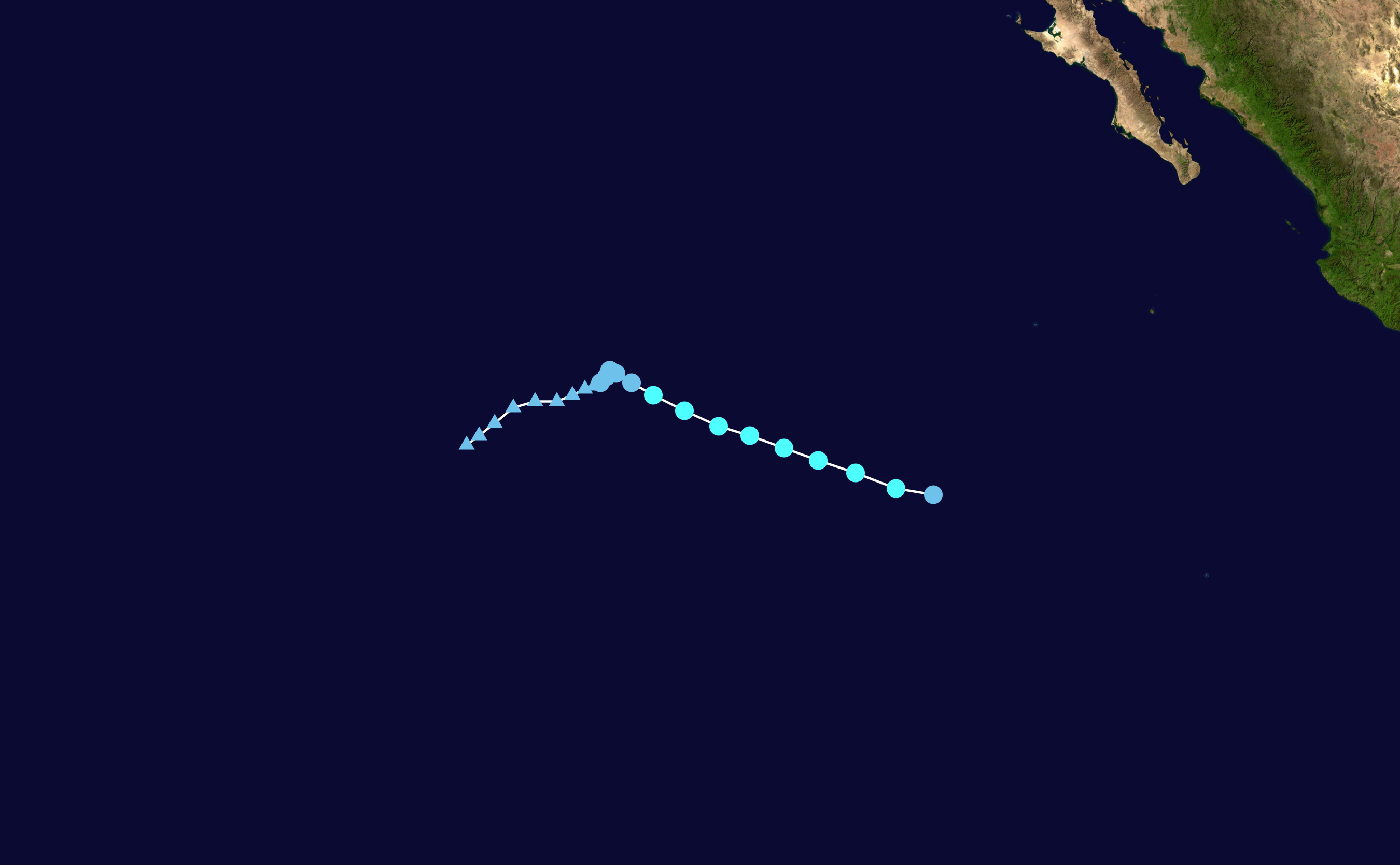
- Duration: October 6 – October 10
- Peak intensity: 65 mph (100 km/h) (1-min); 997 mbar (hPa)

A tropical wave emerged off the western coast of Africa on September 12 and entered the East Pacific almost two weeks later. On October 1, an area of low pressure detached from the wave and began to organize as it moved west-northwest. Organized convective bands were observed by 18:00 UTC on October 6, marking the formation of a tropical depression about 865 mi (1,392 km) southwest of the southern tip of Baja California; six hours later, the depression strengthened into Tropical Storm Narda. Amid a favorable environment, the cyclone steadily intensified after designation, attaining peak winds of 65 mph (105 km/h) by 18:00 UTC on October 7 as a partial eyewall became evident on satellite. However, associated convection began to weaken thereafter as Narda encountered drier air and stronger wind shear. At 00:00 UTC on October 9, Narda weakened to a tropical depression; after producing intermittent convection for a day, the system degenerated into a remnant low by 12:00 UTC on October 10. The low moved southwest and dissipated a few days later.

=== Tropical Storm Octave ===
- Tropical storm (SSHWS)
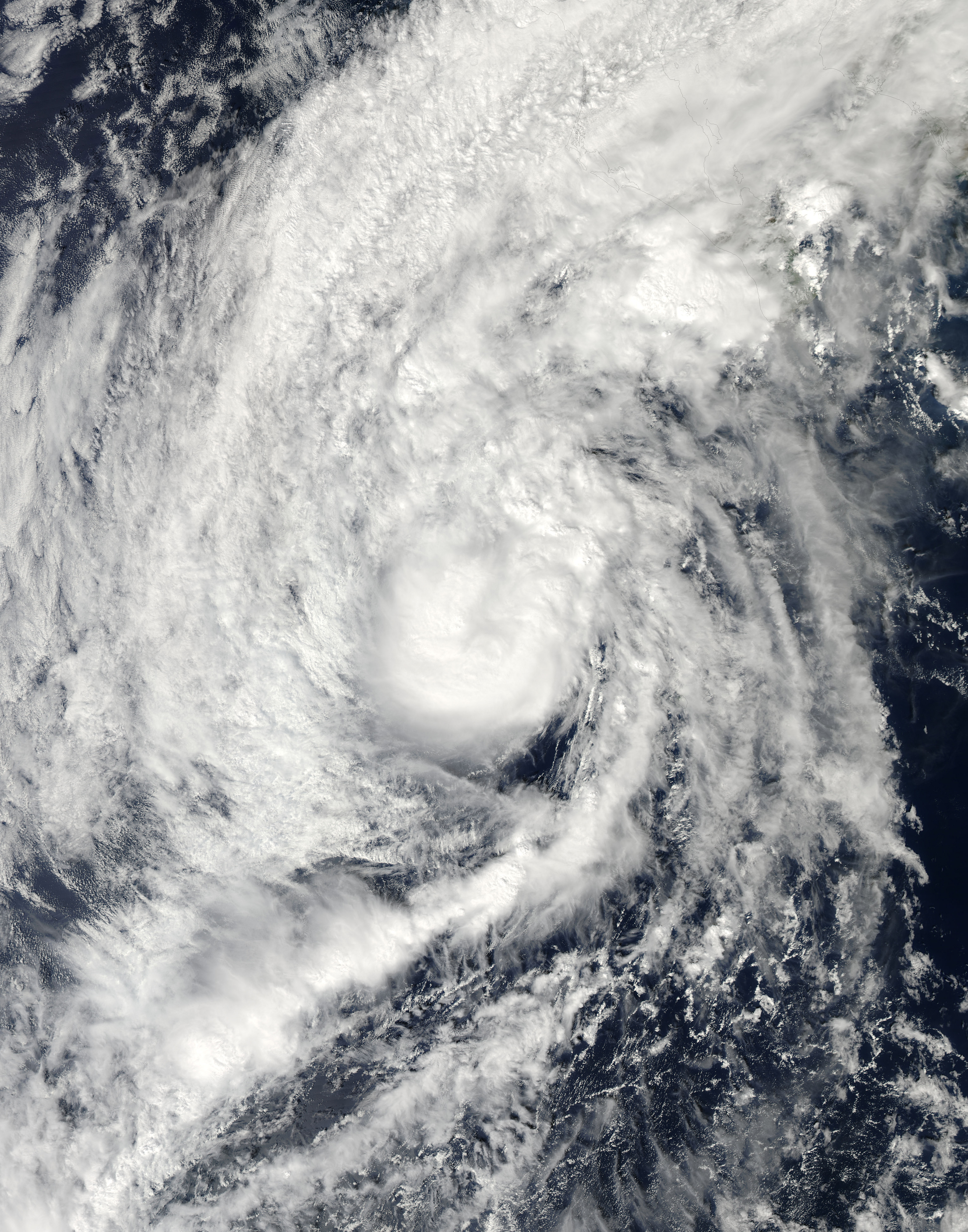
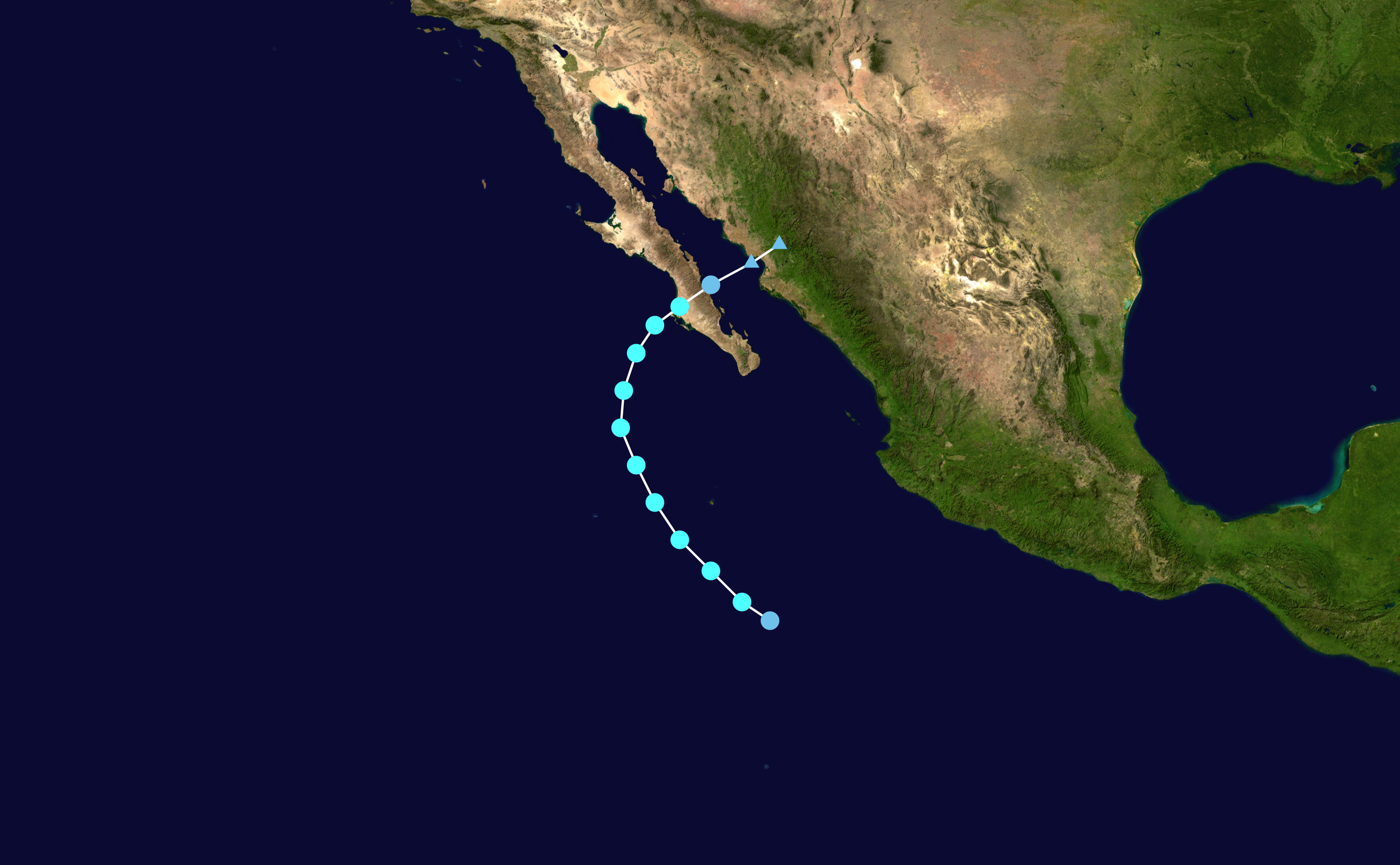
- Duration: October 12 – October 15
- Peak intensity: 65 mph (100 km/h) (1-min); 994 mbar (hPa)

A tropical wave moved across Central America and into the East Pacific on October 5. While passing south of the coastline of Mexico, the wave interacted with a large area of disturbed weather at the base of an upper-level trough, and the two features eventually merged by October 7. The incipient disturbance steadily organized over subsequent days, leading to the formation of a tropical depression by 18:00 UTC on October 12 while located about 545 mi (875 km) south of the southern tip of Baja California; six hours later, the depression intensified into Tropical Storm Octave. Gradually recurving northeast around a subtropical ridge, the cyclone steadily strengthened amid a favorable atmospheric environment, reaching a peak intensity of 65 mph (105 km/h) by 18:00 UTC on October 13. Thereafter, the cloud pattern became increasingly disorganized as wind shear increased the storm moved over cooler waters. The system moved ashore near Cabo San Lazaro, Mexico at 05:00 UTC on October 15 with maximum winds of 45 mph (70 km/h) and quickly weakened over land. By 12:00 UTC, Octave weakened to a tropical depression, and six hours later, it further degenerated into a remnant low over the southern portion of Sonora. The low dissipated shortly thereafter.

6 inches of rain were reported in Baja California Sur and Northern Mexico. However, only minor flooding was reported. Moisture from Octave caused flash flooding in Texas and New Mexico. Damages from in both states totaled to US$34,000.

=== Tropical Storm Priscilla ===
- Tropical storm (SSHWS)
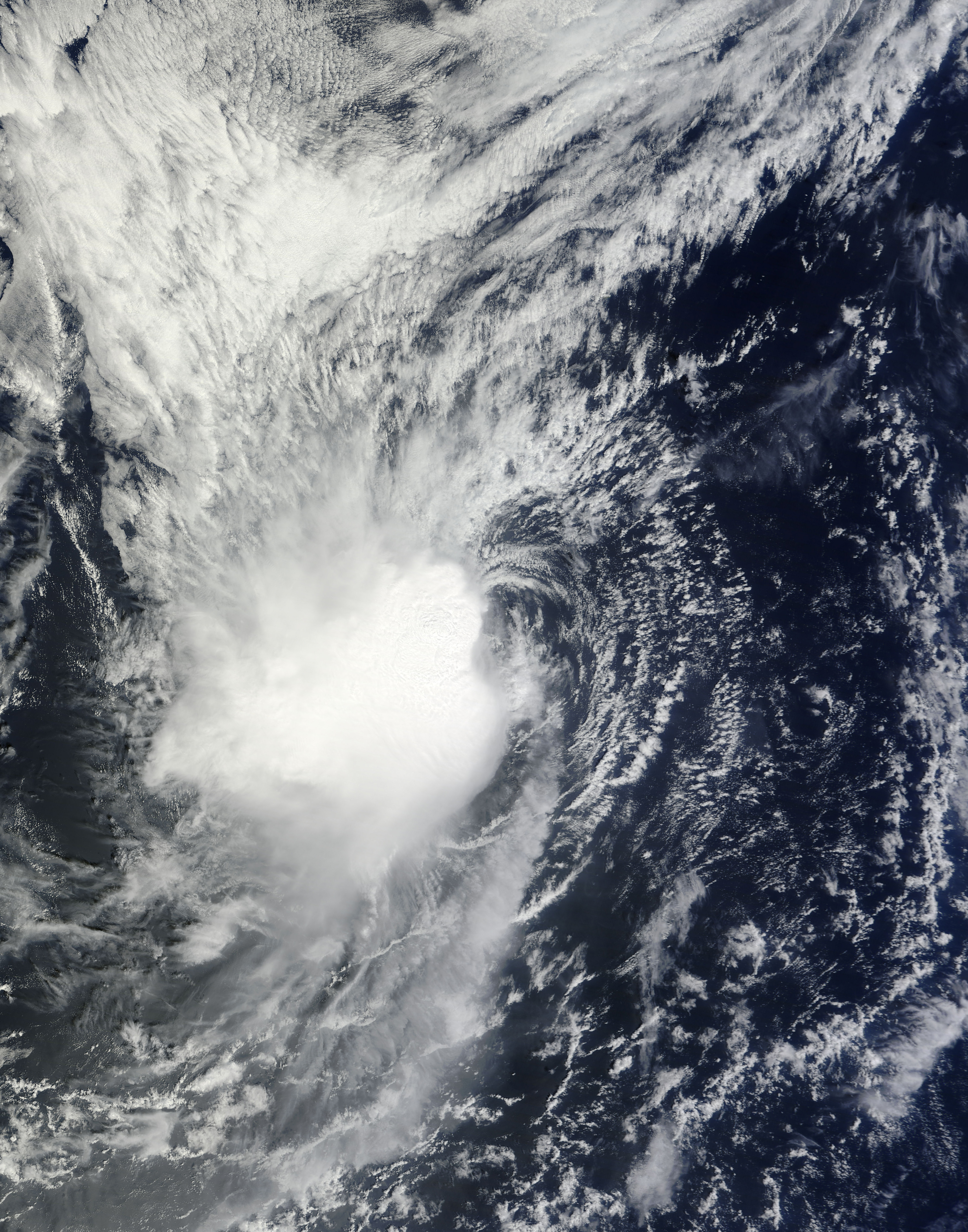
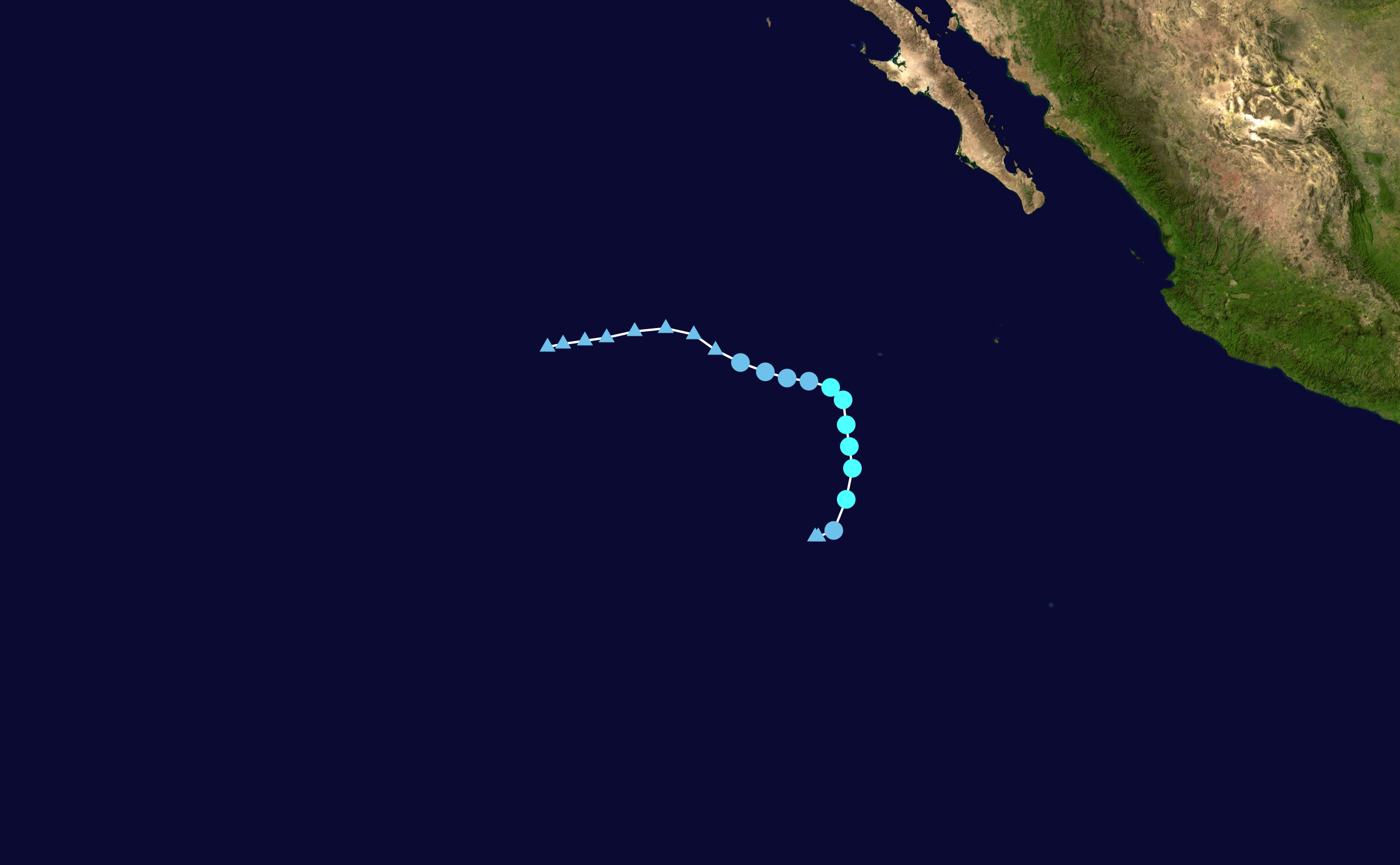
- Duration: October 14 – October 16
- Peak intensity: 45 mph (75 km/h) (1-min); 1001 mbar (hPa)

An area of convection, possibly in relation to a tropical wave that emerged off the western coast of Africa on September 16, developed along the ITCZ on October 7. Becoming embedded within a pre-existing, broad circulation, the disturbance only slowly congealed due to wind shear from nearby Tropical Storm Octave. Despite this, it acquired sufficient organization to be deemed a tropical depression by 00:00 UTC on October 14 while located about 810 mi (1,300 km) south-southwest of the southern tip of Baja California. Steered northwest and north around a mid-level ridge over Mexico, the depression became a tropical storm by 06:00 UTC and attained peak winds of 45 mph (70 km/h) six hours later. Thereafter, a combination of cooler waters and the continued influences of Octave caused Priscilla to weaken. At 18:00 UTC on October 15, it was downgraded to a tropical depression, and by 18:00 UTC the following day, the cyclone degenerated into a remnant low. The low turned westward before dissipating on October 18.

=== Hurricane Raymond ===
- Category 3 hurricane (SSHWS)
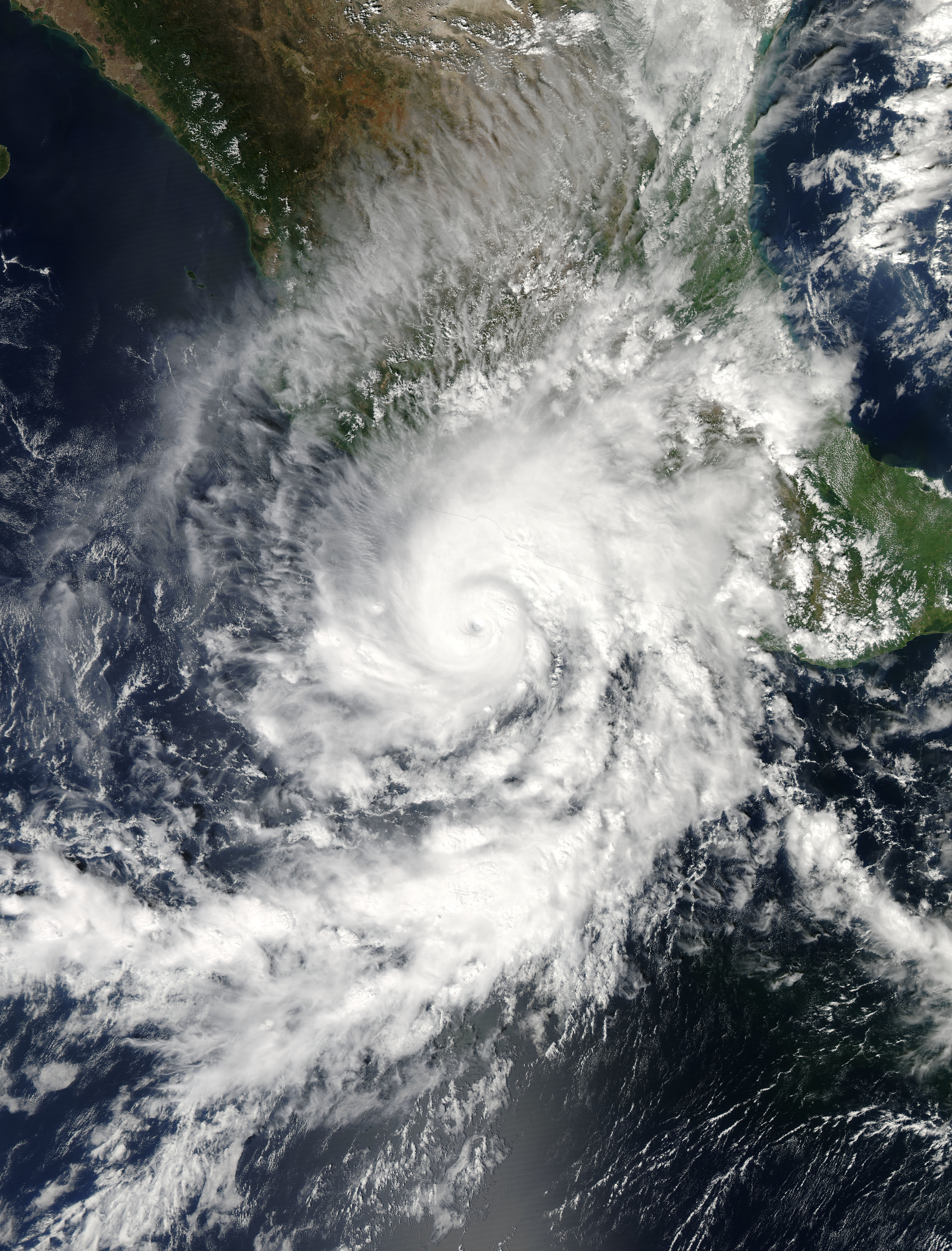
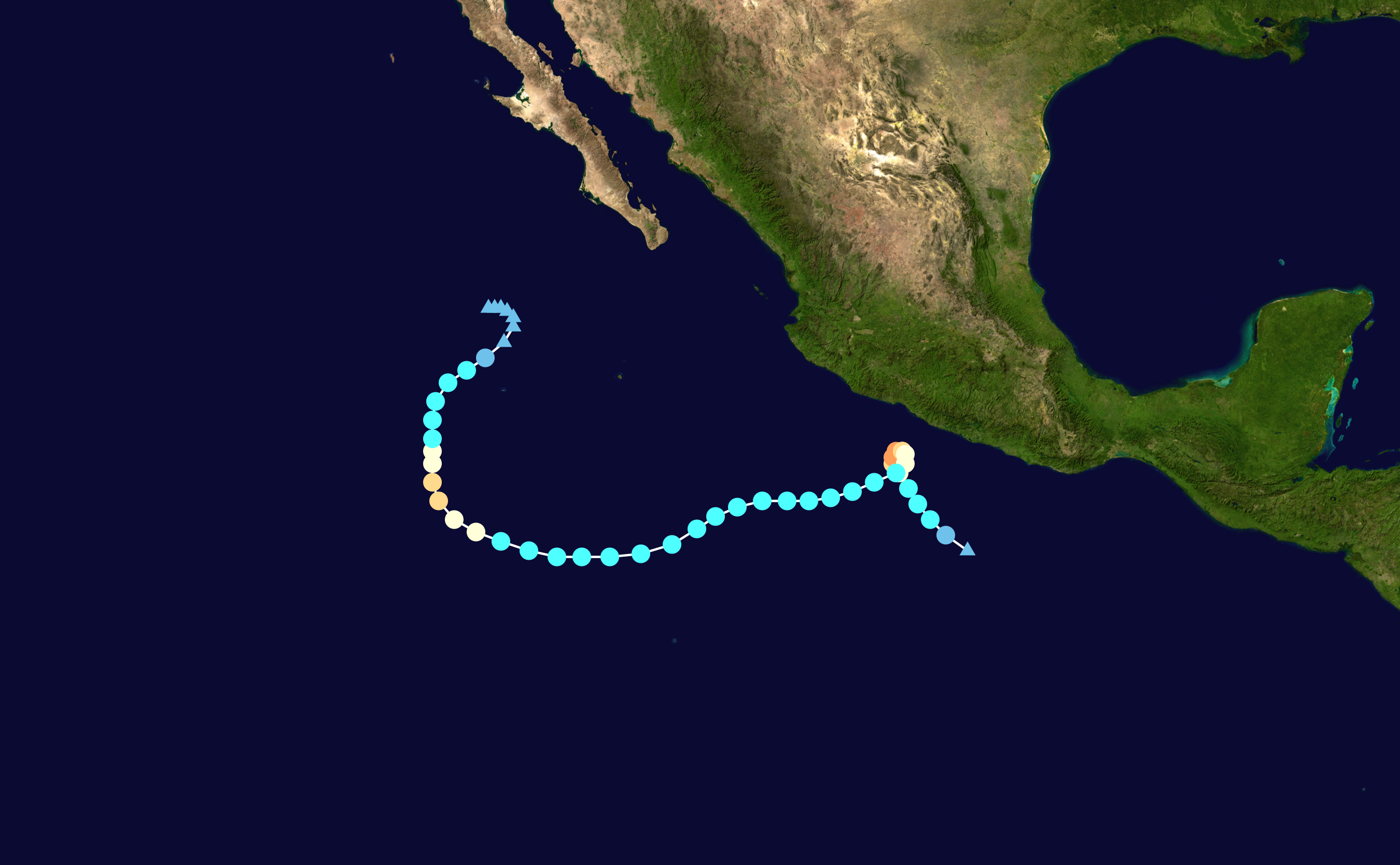
- Duration: October 20 – October 30
- Peak intensity: 125 mph (205 km/h) (1-min); 951 mbar (hPa)

A disturbance within the ITCZ was first identified over the southwestern Caribbean Sea on October 13, crossing Central America and entering the East Pacific over the subsequent three days. Deep convection steadily increased and organized into curved spiral bands, leading to the formation of Tropical Depression Seventeen-E early on October 20. Within six hours, it strengthened into Tropical Storm Raymond while located about 185 mi (300 km) south-southwest of Acapulco, Mexico. Steered northwest by a series of ridges to the cyclone's north, Raymond rapidly intensified amid warm ocean temperatures and low wind shear, becoming a hurricane by 00:00 UTC on October 21. A small, well-defined eye developed in the center of the convection. On October 22, Raymond strengthened into a major hurricane, with peak winds of 125 mph (200 km/h). This made it the first major hurricane in the West Hemisphere during 2013. Raymond subsequently executed a loop, during which it weakened due to increased wind shear and cold water upwelling. Turning west-southwest around the southern periphery of a ridge near Baja California Peninsula, Raymond weakened to a tropical storm on October 23. Continuing westward, it remained a tropical storm for several days, until conditions improved on October 26. On the next day, Raymond re-attained hurricane status as an eye re-developed. It attained a secondary peak intensity of 105 mph (165 km/h) on October 28. Around that time, the hurricane turned to the north ahead of an approaching trough, while wind shear increased. Raymond quickly weakened, dropping to tropical storm status on October 29. On the next day, it degenerated into a remnant low after all convection dissipated. The remnant turned west and dissipated on November 1.

Despite remaining offshore, Raymond's close proximity to the Mexican coast was enough to prompt tropical cyclone warnings and watches. Due to the threat of rainfall, residents from 81 municipalities in Mexico were ordered to evacuate out of flood-prone regions. Schools closed in most coastal communities west of Acapulco.Precipitation from Raymond peaked at 7.63 in (194 mm) near Acapulco within a two-day period. Some streets in Acapulco were closed. Minor flooding resulted from the outer rainbands of the hurricane. A total of 21 homes were flooded, resulting in the evacuation of five persons. Three trees fell down and two walls collapsed. The storm left 585 people homeless. Following the storm, the Mexican government declared a state of emergency for 10 municipalities in Guerrero.

=== Tropical Storm Sonia ===
- Tropical storm (SSHWS)
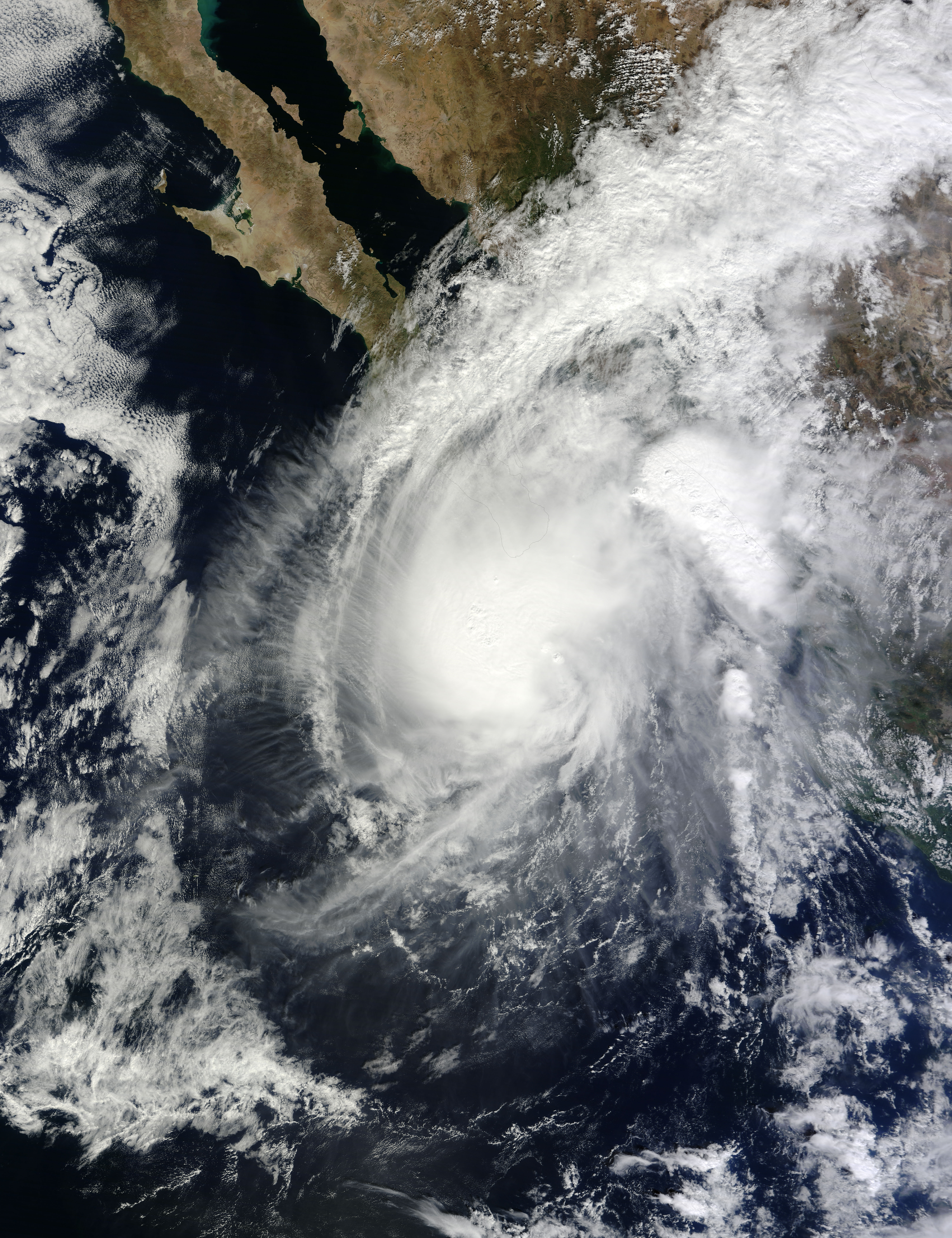
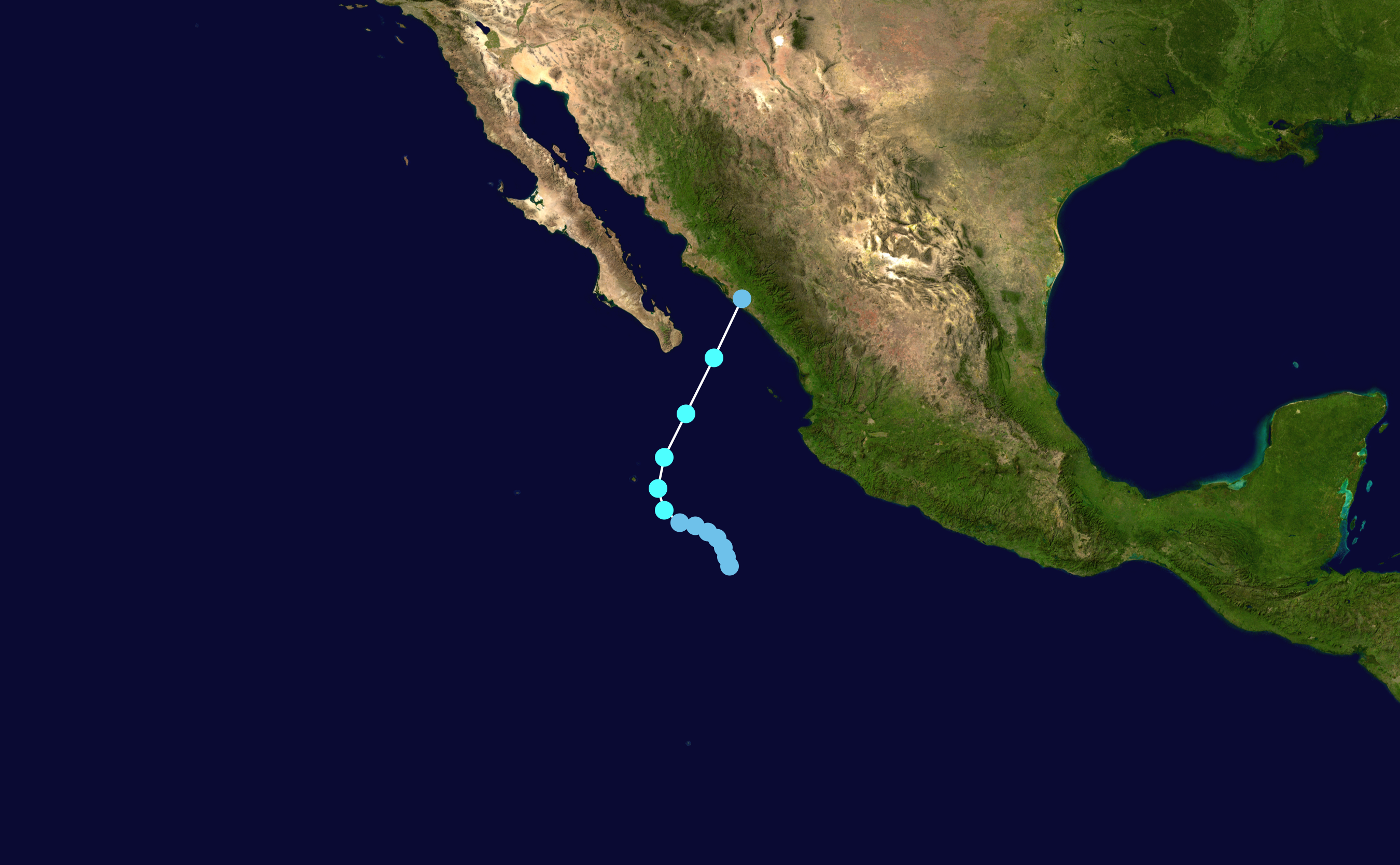
- Duration: November 1 – November 4
- Peak intensity: 45 mph (75 km/h) (1-min); 1002 mbar (hPa)

A strong upward pulse of the Madden–Julian oscillation pushed across the East Pacific during the last week of October, yielding the formation of a broad area of low pressure. A tropical wave passed through this gyre late on October 26, leading to the formation of disorganized convection. After several days of consolidation, the disturbance acquired sufficient organization to be declared a tropical depression by 06:00 UTC on November 1. Gradually recurving northeast in response to a series of troughs to the system's north, the cyclone only slowly organized under moderate wind shear, and the depression intensified into Tropical Storm Sonia by 00:00 UTC on November 3. After reaching peak winds of 45 mph (70 km/h) later that afternoon, an additional increase in upper-level winds caused the cyclone to weaken to minimum tropical storm intensity as it made landfall near El Dorado, Mexico early on November 4. Sonia weakened rapidly once inland, becoming a tropical depression at 06:00 UTC and dissipating over the Sierra Madre Occidental mountain range six hours later.

== Storm names ==
The following list of names was used for named storms that formed in the North Pacific Ocean east of 140°W during 2013. This was the same list used for the 2007 season.

- Alvin
- Barbara
- Cosme
- Dalila
- Erick
- Flossie *
- Gil *
- Henriette *
- Ivo
- Juliette
- Kiko
- Lorena
- Manuel
- Narda
- Octave
- Priscilla
- Raymond
- Sonia
- Tico (unused)
- Velma (unused)
- Wallis (unused)
- Xina (unused)
- York (unused)
- Zelda (unused)

For storms that form in the North Pacific between 140°W to the International Date Line, the names come from a series of four rotating lists. Names are used one after the other without regard to year, and when the bottom of one list is reached, the next named storm receives the name at the top of the next list. Two named storms, listed below, formed within the area in 2013. Also, named storms in the table above that crossed into the area during the season are noted (*).

- Pewa
- Unala

=== Retirement ===
On April 10, 2014, at the 36th session of the RA IV hurricane committee, the World Meteorological Organization retired the name Manuel due to the damage and deaths it caused, and the name will not be used for another eastern North Pacific tropical storm or hurricane. Manuel was replaced with Mario for the 2019 season. (Note: On April 10, 2014, the World Meteorological Organization also retired the name Ingrid from its rotating Atlantic name lists.)

== Season effects ==
This is a table of all of the tropical cyclones that formed in the 2013 Pacific hurricane season. It includes their name, duration (within the basin), peak classification and intensities, areas affected, damage, and death totals. Deaths in parentheses are additional and indirect (an example of an indirect death would be a traffic accident), but were still related to that storm. Damage and deaths include totals while the storm was extratropical, a wave, or a low, and all of the damage figures are in 2013 USD.

Saffir–Simpson scale
TD	TS	C1	C2	C3	C4	C5

2013 Pacific hurricane season statistics
Storm name	Dates active	Storm category at peak intensity	Max 1-min wind mph (km/h)	Min. press. (mbar)	Areas affected	Damage (US$)	Deaths	Ref(s).
Alvin	May 15–17	Tropical storm	60 (95)	1000	None	None	None	
Barbara	May 28–30	Category 1 hurricane	80 (130)	983	Central America, Southwestern Mexico, Eastern Mexico	$148 million	5	
Cosme	June 23–27	Category 1 hurricane	85 (140)	980	Western Mexico, Baja California Peninsula	Minimal	3	
Dalila	June 29 – July 7	Category 1 hurricane	80 (130)	984	Southwestern Mexico, Western Mexico	Minimal	None	
Erick	July 4–9	Category 1 hurricane	80 (130)	983	Southwestern Mexico, Western Mexico, Baja California Peninsula	$30.3 million	2	
Flossie	July 25–30	Tropical storm	70 (110)	994	Hawaii	$24,000	None	
Gil	July 30 – August 6	Category 1 hurricane	85 (140)	985	None	None	None	
Henriette	August 3–11	Category 2 hurricane	105 (165)	976	None	None	None	
Pewa	August 16–18	Tropical storm	65 (100)	1000	None (before crossover)	None	None	
Unala	August 19	Tropical storm	40 (65)	998	None (before crossover)	None	None	
Three-C	August 19–20	Tropical depression	35 (55)	1008	None (before crossover)	None	None	
Ivo	August 22–25	Tropical storm	45 (75)	997	Baja California Peninsula, Western United States	$88.6 million	1	
Juliette	August 28–29	Tropical storm	65 (100)	997	Western Mexico, Baja California Peninsula, Northwestern Mexico	Minimal	1	
Kiko	August 30 – September 2	Category 1 hurricane	75 (120)	989	Baja California Peninsula	None	None	
Lorena	September 5–7	Tropical storm	50 (85)	1002	Western Mexico, Baja California Peninsula	$25,000	None	
Manuel	September 13–19	Category 1 hurricane	75 (120)	983	Southwestern Mexico, Western Mexico, Northwestern Mexico, Texas	$4.2 billion	169	
Narda	October 6–10	Tropical storm	65 (100)	997	None	None	None	
Octave	October 12–15	Tropical storm	65 (100)	994	Baja California Peninsula, Northwestern Mexico	$34,000	None	
Priscilla	October 14–16	Tropical storm	45 (75)	1001	None	None	None	
Raymond	October 20–30	Category 3 hurricane	125 (205)	951	Southwestern Mexico	Minimal	None	
Sonia	November 1–4	Tropical storm	45 (75)	1002	Northwestern Mexico	$690,000	2	
Season aggregates
21 systems	May 15 – November 4		125 (205)	951		$4.47 billion	183	

== See also ==
- Tropical cyclones in 2013
- 2013 Atlantic hurricane season
- 2013 Pacific typhoon season
- 2013 North Indian Ocean cyclone season
- South-West Indian Ocean cyclone seasons: 2012–13, 2013–14
- Australian region cyclone seasons: 2012–13, 2013–14
- South Pacific cyclone seasons: 2012–13, 2013–14
