= List of named storms (E) =

Storms are named for historical reasons to avoid confusion when communicating with the public, as more than one storm can exist at a time. Names are drawn in order from predetermined lists. For tropical cyclones, names are assigned when a system has one-, three-, or ten-minute winds of more than 65 km/h (40 mph). Standards, however, vary from basin to basin. For example, some tropical depressions are named in the Western Pacific, while within the Australian and Southern Pacific regions, the naming of tropical cyclones are delayed until they have gale-force winds occurring more than halfway around the storm center.

This list covers the letter E.

== Storms ==
Note: † indicates the name was retired after that usage in the respective basin

- Earl

- 1980 – drifted over the central Atlantic Ocean without affecting land.
- 1986 – drifted over the central Atlantic Ocean without affecting land.
- 1992 – headed towards eastern Florida then veered away. No damage was reported.
- 1998 – struck the Florida Panhandle, causing approximately US$79 million in damage and 3 fatalities.
- 2004 – traveled across the Windward Islands, then dissipated. Its remnants became Hurricane Frank in the eastern Pacific Ocean.
- 2010 – a strong, long-lived category 4 that affected most of the United States east coast and Canada.
- 2016 – struck Belize as a minimal hurricane, then made a second landfall near Veracruz, Mexico as a tropical storm. The storm caused US$250 million in damage and 106 deaths.
- 2022 – a Category 2 hurricane that drifted over the central Atlantic Ocean, caused 2 fatalities in Puerto Rico when it neared the island as a tropical storm.

- Easy

- 1950 – made landfall in Florida as a Category 3 hurricane; caused heavy damage in Cedar Key and produced heavy rainfall
- 1951 – Category 4 hurricane that never threatened land.
- 1952 – A Category 2 hurricane that never threatened land.

- Eçaí (2016) – a South Atlantic subtropical cyclone
- Ed

- 1980 – a weak tropical storm that minimal affected Philippines.
- 1984 – a Category 3 typhoon that made landfall Eastern China.
- 1987 – a weak tropical depression that never threatened land.
- 1990 – a Category 2 typhoon that affected Northern Philippines and Vietnam.
- 1993 – a Category 5 typhoon that never threatened land.

- Edeng

- 1964 – turned away from China.
- 1968 – did not significantly impact land.
- 1972 – affected the Philippines, Taiwan, and China.
- 1976
- 1980 – made landfall on southeastern China.
- 1984 – affected the Philippines and Taiwan.
- 1988 – struck the Philippines and southern China.
- 1992 – struck Japan, killing 2.
- 1996 – made landfall on Hainan and Vietnam, killing 104.
- 2000 – killed 188 along its path. In addition, along with Tropical Depression Gloring, caused the Payatas landslide, a deadly garbage dump collapse, killing at least a further 218.

- Edilson (2014) – a strong tropical storm that affected the Mauritius Islands with very heavy rainfall.
- Edith

- 1955 – a Category 2 hurricane which formed in the north-western Atlantic and approached Bermuda as a Category 1.
- 1959 – a short-lived tropical storm that headed west-northwestward into the Antilles.
- 1963 – a Category 2 peaking at the Lesser Antilles and affecting the Greater Antilles as a tropical storm, causing ten deaths.
- 1967 (January) – a Category 3 severe tropical cyclone (Australian scale) south of East Java and west of northern-Western Australia.
- 1967 (September) – a mild tropical storm hitting the Lesser Antilles.
- 1971 (January) — a tropical storm-equivalent in the NHC/CPHC classification that formed off the Swahili coast and dissipated in Madagascar.
- 1971 (September) – strongest hurricane in the 1971 Atlantic hurricane season.

- Edna

- 1945 – never threatened land.
- 1953 – a powerful category 3 hurricane affected Bermuda.
- 1954 – a deadly and destructive major hurricane that impacted the United States East Coast in September of the 1954 Atlantic hurricane season.
- 1964 – never threatened land.
- 1968 – never threatened land.
- 1980 – a weak tropical cyclone minimal affected Indonesia.
- 2014 – a weak tropical cyclone impacted the French Territory of New Caledonia.

- Edouard

- 1984 – a short-lived tropical storm in the Bay of Campeche and brushed Veracruz's port.
- 1990 – a tropical storm that affected the Azores in August.
- 1996 – a Category 4 hurricane that impacted New England and Atlantic Canada but remained offshore.
- 2002 – a typical tropical storm that crossed Florida west.
- 2008 – a tropical storm that entered Texas.
- 2014 – Category 3 that strayed from land and whisked around in the North Atlantic Ocean.
- 2020 – a weak tropical storm that journeyed from the East Coast to Northern Europe while briefly affecting Bermuda and showering Europe.
- 2026 – a tropical storm that made landfall in the southwest corner of Louisiana.

- Edzani (2010) – a Category 5 tropical cyclone, churned in the open ocean.
- Egay

- 2003 – approached the Philippines, South Korea and Japan.
- 2007 – A powerful typhoon that affected the Philippines and made landfall in Taiwan and Fujian.
- 2011 – approached the Philippines and Taiwan.
- 2015 – a tropical cyclone that affected the northern Philippines, Taiwan and southern China in early July 2015.
- 2019 – failed to become a tropical storm.
- 2023† – a super typhoon that ravaged across Northern Philippines, Taiwan and Southern China, becoming the costliest typhoon to hit China and this basin.

- Eileen

- 1947 – a weak tropical storm made landfall South China.
- 1964 – a weak tropical storm affected Madagascar.
- 1966 – a category 1 typhoon that never threatened land.
- 1970 – a weak tropical storm made landfall Mexico.
- 1974 – never threatened land.

- Ekeka (1992) – was the most intense off-season tropical cyclone on record in the northeastern Pacific basin.
- Eketsang (2019) – affected the south coast of Madagascar.
- Elaine

- 1949 – a strong typhoon made landfall Philippines and South China.
- 1952 – a weak tropical storm that never threatened land.
- 1957 – a category 4 typhoon that never threatened land.
- 1960 – a strong typhoon affected Philippines, Taiwan and China.
- 1963 – never threatened land.
- 1965 – a moderate tropical storm that affected South China.
- 1967 – a strong tropical cyclone affected Queensland.
- 1968 – a powerful category 5 typhoon hit extreme northern Luzon.
- 1971 – a category 3 typhoon made landfall Philippines and affected South China and Vietnam.
- 1974 (September) – never threatened land.
- 1974 (October) – a Category 2 typhoon made landfall Philippines.
- 1978 – struck the Northern Philippines and the Chinese province of Guangdong.
- 1999† – a severe tropical cyclone along with Cyclone Vance, both made landfall and caused destruction in Western Australia.

- Elang

- 1965 – impacted the Philippines and Japan.
- 1969 – an extremely deadly Category 4 typhoon that caused around 10,000 deaths when it made landfall on China.
- 1973 – struck southern China and Vietnam as a tropical depression.
- 1977 – made landfall on the Philippines, Hainan, and Vietnam.
- 1981 – caused 28 deaths along its path.
- 1985 – considered a tropical storm by the PAGASA.
- 1989 – struck the Philippines, Hainan, and Vietnam.
- 1993 – crossed the Philippines.
- 1997 – a Category 5 super typhoon that made landfall on Japan as a Category 1 typhoon, killing 5 people.

- Eleanor

- 1967 – a strong tropical storm that never threatened land
- 1971 – a short-lived, weak tropical storm that stayed well out to sea.
- 1975 – a weak tropical storm made landfall near Manzanillo.
- 2024 – a severe tropical storm that affected Mauritius and Reunion.

- Elena

- 1965 – never threatened land.
- 1979 – made landfall in Texas as a weak tropical storm, causing $10 million in damage and two fatalities.
- 1985† – a damaging Category 3 hurricane which made landfall in Mississippi causing $1.3 billion (1985 USD) in damage.

- Eli

- 1992 – struck the Philippines and Hainan during mid-July 1992.
- 1995 – a weak tropical storm with no impacts on land.

- Elia (2006) – remained at sea, without impacting land.
- Eliakim (2018) – a tropical cyclone that affected Madagascar and killed 21 people in 2018.
- Eliceca (1995) – a short-lived tropical depression near Madagascar
- Elida

- 1984 – a Category 4 hurricane with no impacts on land.
- 1990 – a Category 1 hurricane with no impacts on land.
- 1996 – a moderate tropical storm with limited impacts, mainly rainfall, on the Baja California peninsula.
- 2002 – a rare Category 5 hurricane that strengthened in record time for a Pacific hurricane; impacts on land were limited to large swells.
- 2008 – a Category 2 hurricane with no impacts on land.
- 2014 – a weak tropical storm with no impacts on land.
- 2020 – a Category 2 hurricane with no impacts on land.
- 2026 – a strong tropical storm that did not affect land.

- Eline (2000) – was the second longest-lived Indian Ocean tropical cyclone on record (behind Cyclone Freddy), traveling over 11,000 km (6,800 mi) during its 29‑day duration throughout the entire month of February.
- Elinor (1946) – a tropical storm that affected Philippines and Taiwan.
- Elisa

- 1966 – a Category 1 tropical with no impacts on land.
- 2008 – a Category 2 tropical cyclone brought heavy rain to Tonga and Niue, and damaged several fruit-bearing trees in Tongatapu and Eua.

- Elita (2004) – was an unusual tropical cyclone that made landfall on Madagascar three times.
- Ella

- 1958 – deadly hurricane in Haiti and Cuba with over 35 deaths; tracked from the Lesser Antilles to southern Texas where it dissipated.
- 1962 – strongest hurricane of the season; formed near Bahamas and tracked through the western Atlantic Ocean.
- 1966 – tracked from tropical Atlantic before dissipating north of the Lesser Antilles
- 1968 – short-lived weak tropical storm.
- 1970 – struck northeastern Mexico as a major hurricane.
- 1976 – short-lived storm that persisted to the northwest of Madagascar.
- 1978 – strongest hurricane of the season; reached Category 4 status east of Maryland and south of Nova Scotia before brushing Newfoundland.
- 1997 – short-lived tropical storm that dissipated near the Northern Marianas Islands
- 1999 – tropical storm that passed through the Loyalty Islands, causing some damage on Lifou Island but no reported casualties.

- Ellen

- 1950 – remained at sea, without impacting land.
- 1955 – a category 1 typhoon minimal affected Japan.
- 1959 – a Category 3 typhoon made landfall on Japan.
- 1961 –
- 1964 –
- 1967 –
- 1970 –
- 1973 (July) – struck Japan.
- 1973 (September)
- 1976 – struck Hong Kong.
- 1980 –
- 1983 – struck the Philippines.
- 1986 –

- Ellie

- 1991 – an unusually small typhoon which hit Taiwan as a tropical storm.
- 1994 – a powerful category 1 typhoon impact Japan, Northeast China and Korean Peninsula
- 2009 – Category 1 tropical cyclone that made landfall Queensland.
- 2022 – Category 1 tropical cyclone that made landfall Northern Territory and Western Australia.

- Ellis

- 1979 – affected the Philippines and made landfall on southern China as a tropical storm.
- 1982 – weakened before making landfall on Japan.
- 1985 – did not significantly affect land.
- 1989 – struck Japan.

- Elnora (1947) – a tropical storm that stayed out to sea.
- Elnus (2007) – a weak tropical storm that affected Mozambique, Malawi and Madagascar.
- Eloise

- 1975† – Category 3 hurricane that caused torrential rains and strong winds on the islands of Puerto Rico and Hispaniola, Cuba and the coast of the United States, causing extensive flooding that caused severe damage and the death of more than 80 people.
- 2021 – was the strongest tropical cyclone to impact the country of Mozambique since Cyclone Kenneth in 2019.

- Elsa

- 1975 – affected Madagascar and Mozambique but no damage was reported.
- 1976† – a Category 2 tropical cyclone that made landfall Vanuatu and New Caledonia
- 2021 – formed in the eastern Caribbean Sea, the earliest fifth named storm in the Atlantic; twice became a minimal hurricane, though made landfall in Cuba and later in Florida and then in Rhode Island, each while at tropical storm intensity.

- Elsie

- 1950 – a strong typhoon affected Japan and South Korea.
- 1954 – major typhoon that moved up the coast of Vietnam, which then rapidly strengthened, before rapidly weakening before hitting China.
- 1958 – typhoon that moved to the north of Japan, before transitioning into an extratropical cyclone.
- 1961 – slow moving typhoon that neared the coast of Taiwan before speeding up. It then hit China as a moderate storm.
- 1964 – category 3-equivalent typhoon that rapidly strengthened as it neared the coast of Luzon, before rapidly weakening right before landfall.
- 1966 – category 4-equivalent typhoon that brought record-breaking rainfall to parts of Taiwan.
- 1969 – super typhoon that made landfall on Taiwan as a moderate typhoon, and then went on to hit China as a category 1.
- 1972 – moderate typhoon that slowed down before hitting Vietnam as a typhoon.
- 1975 – super typhoon that passed to the south of Taiwan at peak intensity, before going on to hit Hong Kong as a moderate typhoon.
- 1981 – super typhoon that stayed out to sea.
- 1985 – second of two systems to form in January. Both of these systems co-existed together for about 4 days.
- 1987† – a powerful tropical cyclone that made landfall near the same region catastrophic damage was reported at Mandora Station.
- 1988 – short-lived system that never posed a threat to land.
- 1989 – intense super typhoon that made a catastrophic landfall on Luzon as a category 5-equivalent typhoon.
- 1992 – super typhoon that maintained category 5 status for a day, and stayed out to sea.
- 1998 – a strong tropical cyclone that stayed out to sea.

- Elvis

- 1998 – a weak tropical storm which devastated Philippines and Vietnam, claiming 49 lives.
- 2025 – a weak tropical storm that affected in Madagascar.

- Ema

- 1982 – never threatened land.
- 2019 – did not affect land.

- Emang

- 1966 – a strong early-season typhoon which hit Japan, resulting to 64 deaths.
- 1970 – high-end tropical storm that made landfall in the Philippines and China before becoming extratropical.
- 1974 – a system only recognized by PAGASA.
- 1978 – a relatively strong typhoon which hit Japan.
- 1982 – crossed the Philippines and China, causing minor damage.
- 1986 – a short-lived tropical storm which remained at sea during its lifespan.
- 1990 – a damaging tropical storm which brought major flooding to China, killing at least 108.
- 1994 – another destructive tropical storm that devastated China, claiming at least 74 lives.
- 1998 – strong but short-lived typhoon which affected Japan, causing 6 fatalities.
- 2013 – a weak tropical storm which affected no land areas.

- Emeraude (2016) – a Category 4 tropical cyclone, churned in the open ocean.
- Emilia

- 1978 – never affected land.
- 1982 – never affected land.
- 1988 – never affected land.
- 1994 – Category 5 hurricane, threatened Hawaii but turned away without affecting land.
- 2000 – never affected land.
- 2006 – came near Baja California but turned away.
- 2012 – strong Category 4 hurricane, churned in the open ocean.
- 2018 – never affected land.
- 2024 – a strong tropical storm that never threatened land.

- Emily

- 1962 – short-lived storm, no threat to land.
- 1963 – a Category 1 hurricane moving west it then turned to the north and dissipated over the mountainous regions of Mexico.
- 1965 – a Category 1 hurricane affected California.
- 1969 – a strong tropical storm no casualties or damages were reported.
- 1972† – a Category 4 tropical cyclone that made landfall Queensland.
- 1973 – strong Category 4 hurricane, churned in the open ocean.
- 1977 – never affected land.
- 1981 – crossed Bermuda.
- 1987 – caused considerable damage to Saint Vincent, Dominican Republic, and Bermuda.
- 1993 – came near Hatteras Island, North Carolina.
- 1999 – no threat to land, absorbed by Hurricane Cindy.
- 2005 – Category 5 hurricane, caused damage in Grenada, Quintana Roo, and Tamaulipas.
- 2011 – caused minor damage throughout the Caribbean.
- 2017 – made landfall in Tampa, Florida.
- 2023 – remained at sea, without impacting land.

- Emma

- 1952 – a Category 3 typhoon that made landfall Philippines and South China, especially Hainan Island.
- 1956 – a Category 4 typhoon that affected Okinawa and South Korea, killing 77.
- 1959 – a strong typhoon that struck Okinawa.
- 1962 – damage in Guam and Saipan totaled out to $250,000.
- 1963 – a short-lived tropical storm that persisted southeast of Rodrigues.
- 1965 – a strong tropical storm that made landfall in Japan.
- 1967 – a Category 5 typhoon that struck the Philippines leaving 300 dead and 60 missing.
- 1971 – a weak tropical storm that made landfall in Philippines.
- 1974 – remained at sea and never threatened land.
- 1977 – a powerful tropical storm that minimal affected in Japan.
- 1984 – a Category 3 severe tropical cyclone that made landfall in Western Australia.
- 1995 – stayed well off the Australian coast in the Indian Ocean.
- 2006 – a weak but unusually large tropical cyclone that affected a substantial portion of Western Australia.

- Emmy (1976) – a Category 2 hurricane that passed near the Windward Islands.
- Emnati (2022) – a tropical cyclone that affected Madagascar, only two weeks after Cyclone Batsirai.
- Emong

- 2001 – a powerful tropical cyclone that caused damage and deaths in five countries, the Philippines, Taiwan, China, South Korea, and Japan.
- 2005 – a tropical depression that affected Philippines and South China.
- 2009 – formed off Vietnam, reached typhoon status before landfall in the Philippines.
- 2013 – brushed the Philippines and struck Japan.
- 2017 – a severe tropical storm that impacted southern Japan.
- 2021 – a tropical depression that affected Philippines and Taiwan.
- 2025† – a Category 1 tropical cyclone that affected the Philippines, specifically Ilocos Region and East China.

- Enala (2023) – remained at sea and never threatened land.
- Enang (1964) – made landfall twice, affected the Philippines, Hong Kong and eastern China.
- Enawo (2017) – a strongest tropical cyclone to strike Madagascar since Gafilo in 2004, killing 78 people and causing $400 million in damages.
- Enok (2007) – remained at sea and never threatened land.
- Enrique

- 1979 – strong Category 4 hurricane that remained at sea.
- 1985 – weak tropical storm that brought showers to Hawaii.
- 1991 – long-lived hurricane that was one of seven tropical cyclones to exist in all three tropical cyclone basins in the Pacific Ocean.
- 1997 – remained at sea and never threatened land.
- 2003 – strong tropical storm that had no effects on land.
- 2009 – another strong tropical storm that did not affect land.
- 2015 – lasted for a week without affecting land.
- 2021 – strong Category 1 hurricane that paralleled the coast of Mexico.

- Enteng

- 2004 – stayed at sea
- 2008 – a very strong typhoon that didn't affect land
- 2012 – the first tropical cyclone to directly impact Korea in two years.
- 2016 – affected Japan
- 2020 – a minimal storm that affected Korea.
- 2024† – a Category 5-equivalent typhoon that ravaged the Philippines, Hainan, and Northern Vietnam.

- Epi (2003) – a short-lived tropical cyclone that affected Solomon Islands and Papua New Guinea.
- Epsilon

- 2005 – category 1 hurricane that persisted beyond the official November 30 end date of the hurricane season.
- 2020 – late-season Category 3 hurricane that tracked east of Bermuda.

- Eric

- 1985† – a deadly system that impacted Vanuatu, Fiji, and Tonga.
- 2009 – brushed the coast of Madagascar.

- Erica

- 1973 – brought heavy rainfall to portions of Western Australia.
- 2003† – a powerful cyclone that severely affected New Caledonia.

- Erick

- 1983 – a strong tropical storm well offshore of Mexico.
- 1989 – never impacted land.
- 1996 – a strong storm well offshore of Mexico.
- 2001 – a weak system that churned in the open ocean.
- 2007 – a short-lived storm, never threatened land.
- 2013 – a Category 1 hurricane that brushed the coast of southwestern Mexico.
- 2019 – a Category 4 hurricane that moved well to the south of Hawaii.
- 2025 – a Category 4 hurricane that made landfall in western Oaxaca.

- Erika

- 1991 – struck São Miguel and Santa Maria islands in the Azores as an extratropical storm.
- 1997 – long-lived Category 3 hurricane that approached the Lesser Antilles before curving northward and moving into the open ocean.
- 2003 – weak Category 1 hurricane that made landfall in northeastern Mexico, near the Texas-Tamaulipas border.
- 2009 – made landfall on Guadeloupe, and dissipated southeast of Puerto Rico the following day.
- 2015† – made landfall on Dominica; caused US$500 million in damage and 31 fatalities.

- Erin

- 1989 – a Category 2 Cape Verde hurricane that stayed away from land.
- 1995 – a Category 2 hurricane that made two landfalls in Florida, resulting in 6 direct deaths and $700 million damage.
- 2001 – a Category 3 major hurricane that passed east of Bermuda.
- 2007 – weak storm that formed in the Gulf of Mexico made landfall in Texas, causing significant flooding.
- 2013 – weak storm that formed near Cape Verde and then moved out into the open ocean.
- 2019 – weak storm that formed off the coast of North Carolina but moved out to sea; its remnants produced heavy rain over the Canadian Maritime provinces.
- 2025 – a powerful, long-lived Category 5 hurricane that impacted Cape Verde, where it killed several people and caused significant damage, the eastern Caribbean, and the Atlantic coast of the United States, but did not make landfall.

- Erling (1971) –
- Ernest (2005) – a Category 3 tropical cyclone that made landfall Madagascar.
- Ernesto

- 1982 – formed southwest of Bermuda and dissipated without threatening land.
- 1988 – formed east of Bermuda and did not cause any damage or casualties.
- 1994 – formed southwest of Cape Verde and dissipated without affecting land.
- 2000 – lasted for two days and did not threaten land.
- 2006 – a Category 1 hurricane which formed near the Windward Islands, made landfall in Haiti and Cuba, struck Florida and the Carolinas, and killed at least 11 people.
- 2012 – a Category 2 hurricane which made landfall in Mexico.
- 2018 – formed in the North Atlantic and dissipated without affecting land.
- 2024 – a Category 2 hurricane which caused significant flooding in Puerto Rico and made landfall in Bermuda.

- Ernie

- 1978 – a strong tropical cyclone affected Fiji.
- 1989 – a weak tropical cyclone minimal impact Solomon Islands.
- 1996 – a weak tropical storm made landfall Philippines killed 24 people and caused $5.1 million in damages.
- 2017 – one of the quickest strengthening tropical cyclones on record.

- Errol

- 1982 – a Category 2 tropical cyclone that caused flood damage in Western Australia.
- 1991 – a Category 4 severe tropical cyclone that remained at sea.
- 2002 – a Category 1 tropical cyclone that passed near Cocos Island.
- 2011 – a Category 3 severe tropical cyclone that affected East Timor.
- 2025 – a Category 4 severe tropical cyclone that made landfall in Western Australia.

- Esami (2020) – a moderate tropical storm without affecting any landmass.
- Esang

- 1978 – a strong late-season typhoon which recurved at sea.
- 1994 – another intense typhoon that remained at sea.

- Eseta

- 1988 – a strong tropical cyclone caused heavy rainfall within Vanuatu, Fiji and New Caledonia however there were no reports of any damages to property or crops
- 2002 – a Category 4 tropical cyclone was well offshore of any islands in the Pacific, rains and wind caused some damage.

- Estelle

- 1960 – a Category 1 hurricane, that affected the coast of Central America and Mexico.
- 1968 – a long-lived tropical storm.
- 1972 – category 1 hurricane.
- 1976 – a weak and short-lived tropical storm.
- 1979 – a weak tropical storm moved around the Mascarene Islands, with a peak rainfall total on Réunion recorded at Petite Plaine.
- 1980 – a weak tropical storm.
- 1986 – a strong hurricane, that moved south of Hawaii.
- 1992 – a category 4 hurricane, that formed far away from the coast.
- 1998 – a category 4 hurricane, that did not affect land.
- 2004 – moved into the Central Pacific.
- 2010 – a strong tropical storm in August.
- 2016 – strong tropical storm, that churned in the open ocean.
- 2022 – a Category 1 hurricane that formed near Mexico but moved out to sea.

- Ester

- 2006 – a powerful category 4 typhoon made landfall South Korea.
- 2010 – a strong tropical storm struck southern South Korea.
- 2014 – that was only recognized by PAGASA and JMA as a tropical storm, and by JTWC as a subtropical storm.
- 2018 – a weak tropical storm minimal affected Taiwan.
- 2022 – struck the mainland of South Korea.
- 2026 – a tropical depression that affected Philippines and Taiwan.

- Esther

- 1957 – a strong tropical storm that made landfall Louisiana.
- 1961 – was the first large tropical cyclone to be discovered by satellite imagery.
- 1969 – a weak tropical cyclone, that churned in the open ocean.
- 1983 – a weak tropical cyclone struck Babar Island.
- 2020 – a weak tropical cyclone affected North Australia.

- Eta (2020)† – was a deadly and erratic Category 4 hurricane that devastated parts of Central America in early November 2020.
- Etang

- 1963 – moderate tropical storm that remained out to sea.
- 1971 – strong tropical storm that affected Philippines and Taiwan.
- 1975 – a tropical depression dissipating on august.
- 1979 – made landfall on southern China as a tropical storm.
- 1983 – formed off the coast of Vietnam and moved toward the Luzon Strait; eventually absorbed into Typhoon Abby.
- 1987 – a minimal typhoon that brushed north Taiwan before striking mainland China; caused little damage from the typhoon, but its remnants contributed to some significant flooding in Korea.
- 1991 – passed over the Philippines before hitting Hainan.
- 1995 – a weak tropical storm that made landfall Eastern China and Korea Peninsula.
- 1999 – a large and powerful typhoon that affected the Philippines and southeast Asia.

- Etau

- 2003 – struck Japan.
- 2009 – approached Japan and brought heavy rain.
- 2015 - struck Japan and brought heavy rain.
- 2020 - a weak tropical storm that made landfall in Vietnam as a tropical depression.
- 2026 – weak tropical storm that stayed out to sea.

- Ethel

- 1956 – formed near the Bahamas and moved out to sea.
- 1960 – a Category 3 hurricane that weakened to a tropical storm prior to making landfall in Pascagoula, Mississippi.
- 1964 – a Category 2 hurricane that passed to the northeast of Bermuda.
- 1996† – twice transited Cape York Peninsula before making a final landfall along the southern coast of the Gulf of Carpentaria, in the Northern Territory.
- 2012 – a Category 1 equivalent cyclone that passed near Rodrigues.

- Eugene

- 1981 – a weak storm that did not affect land.
- 1987 – a category 2 storm that made landfall south of Manzanillo, Mexico; caused heavy flooding and loss of power for Mexican coastal region.
- 1993 – a category 3 storm that made landfall on the Big Island of Hawaii as a tropical depression.
- 1999 – a category 2 storm that remained at sea, passing well south of Hawaii.
- 2005 – briefly threatened Baja California Sur, but remained at sea.
- 2011 – reached Category 4 intensity, but was no threat to land.
- 2017 – a category 3 storm that remained at sea.
- 2023 – passed near Baja California Sur, but moved out to sea.

- Eunice

- 1948 – a weak tropical storm affected Japan.
- 2015 – a powerful tropical cyclone that is mostly offshore.

- Eva

- 1945 – a strong typhoon affected Japan and South Korea.
- 1961 – remained at sea.
- 1964 – a tropical cyclone that remained at sea.
- 1970 – a tropical cyclone that struck northern Australia.
- 2022 – remnants of the cyclone intensified the rainfall during the 2022 eastern Australia floods in late February and early March.

- Evan

- 1997 – which impacted waters northeast of New Zealand.
- 2004 – which brought flooding to Groote Eylandt and the Northern Territory.
- 2012† – which impacted Fiji, Western Samoa, American Samoa, Tonga.

- Eve

- 1969 (January) – a weak tropical depression.
- 1969 (August) – churned the ocean between the Mid-Atlantic U.S. states and Bermuda, remained offshore and caused no impacts in either region.
- 1996 – a Category 5 typhoon, that made landfall Japan.
- 1999 – tracked northwest across the central Philippines and then made landfall southeast of Da Nang, Vietnam.

- Evelyn

- 1966 – a weak tropical depression that remained at sea.
- 1977 – Category 1 that mainly impacted Atlantic Canada and hit Bermuda as a tropical storm.

- Ewetse (2026) – a weak tropical storm that made landfall in the Madagascar.
- Ewiniar

- 2000 – didn't affect land.
- 2006 - system that made landfall in South Korea as a tropical storm while also affecting Palau, Yap, China, and the Ryūkyū Islands in Japan, causing $1.4 billion in damages and 203 deaths.
- 2012 – churned out of the ocean
- 2018 – caused damaging floods to Vietnam and South China, causing 14 deaths and $784 million in damages.
- 2024† – a fairly strong tropical cyclone that impacted parts of the Philippines, particularly Luzon; also known as Aghon within the PAR.

== See also ==
- Tropical cyclone
- Tropical cyclone naming
- European windstorm names
- Atlantic hurricane season
- List of Pacific hurricane seasons
- South Atlantic tropical cyclone
