= Eseta =

Eseta may refer to:

- List of storms named Eseta
- 'Eseta Fusitu'a, Tongan teacher
