= List of storms named Elaine =

The name Elaine has been used for thirteen tropical cyclones worldwide: one in the Atlantic Ocean, ten in the Western Pacific Ocean and two in the Australian Region.

In the Atlantic Ocean:

- Tropical Storm Elaine (1974) – never threatened land.

In the Western Pacific Ocean:

- Typhoon Elaine (1949) – a strong typhoon made landfall Philippinesand South China.
- Typhoon Elaine (1952) – a weak tropical storm that never threatened land.
- Typhoon Elaine (1957) – a category 4 typhoon that never threatened land.
- Typhoon Elaine (1960) – a strong typhoon affected Philippines, Taiwan and China.
- Typhoon Elaine (1963) – never threatened land.
- Tropical Storm Elaine (1965) – a moderate tropical storm affected South China.
- Typhoon Elaine (1968) – a powerful category 5 typhoon hit extreme northern Luzon.
- Typhoon Elaine (1971) – a category 3 typhoon made landfall Philippines and affected South China and Vietnam.
- Typhoon Elaine (1974) – a Category 2 typhoon made landfall Philippines.
- Typhoon Elaine (1978) – struck the Northern Philippines and the Chinese province of Guangdong.

In the Australian Region:

- Cyclone Elaine (1967) – a strong tropical cyclone affected Queensland.
- Cyclone Elaine (1999) – a severe tropical cyclone along with Cyclone Vance, both made landfall and caused destruction in Western Australia.

After the 1998-99 season, the name Elaine was removed from the Australian name list.
