= List of storms named Edeng =

The name Edeng has been used to name 10 tropical cyclones within the Philippine Area of Responsibility by the PAGASA and its predecessor, the Philippine Weather Bureau.

- Typhoon Betty (1964) (T6405, 07W, Edeng) – turned away from China.
- Tropical Storm Olive (1968) (T6806, 09W, Edeng) – did not significantly impact land.
- Typhoon Susan (1972) (T7208, 09W, Edeng) – affected the Philippines, Taiwan, and China.
- 1976 Edeng
- Tropical Storm Georgia (1980) (T8006, 07W, Edeng) – made landfall on southeastern China.
- Tropical Depression 09W (1984) (09W, Edeng-Gloring) – affected the Philippines and Taiwan.
- Tropical Storm Vanessa (1988) (T8804, 05W, Edeng) – struck the Philippines and southern China.
- Tropical Storm Irving (1992) (T9209, 09W, Edeng) – struck Japan, killing 2.
- Tropical Storm Frankie (1996) (T9606, 08W, Edeng) – made landfall on Hainan and Vietnam, killing 104.
- Typhoon Kai-tak (2000) (T0004, 06W, Edeng) – killed 188 along its path.

After the 2000 Pacific typhoon season, the PAGASA revised their naming lists, and the name Edeng was excluded.
