= List of storms named Etang =

The name Etang has been used to name nine tropical cyclones in the Philippine Area of Responsibility in the West Pacific Ocean:

- Tropical Storm Virginia (1963) (T6306, 15W, Etang) – moderate tropical storm that remained out to sea
- Tropical Storm Babe (1971) (T7106, 06W, Etang) – strong tropical storm that affected Philippines and Taiwan.
- Tropical Depression Etang (1975) – a tropical depression dissipating on august.
- Typhoon Ellis (1979) (T7906, 06W, Etang) – made landfall on southern China as a tropical storm.
- Tropical Storm Carmen (1983) (06W, Etang), formed off the coast of Vietnam and moved toward the Luzon Strait; eventually absorbed into Typhoon Abby (Diding)
- Typhoon Alex (1987) (T8708, 08W, Etang), a minimal typhoon that brushed north Taiwan before striking mainland China; caused little damage from the typhoon, but its remnants contributed to some significant flooding in Korea
- Typhoon Zeke (1991) (T9106, 06W, Etang) – passed over the Philippines before hitting Hainan
- Tropical Storm Janis (1995) (T9507, 10W, Etang) – a weak tropical storm that made landfall Eastern China and Korea Peninsula
- Typhoon Maggie (1999) (T9903, 06W, Etang) – a large and powerful typhoon that affected the Philippines and southeast Asia
