= List of storms named Ellie =

The name Ellie has been used for four tropical cyclones worldwide: two in the West Pacific Ocean and two in the Australian region.

In the West Pacific:

- Typhoon Ellie (1991) (T9110, 11W, Mameng) – an unusually small typhoon which hit Taiwan as a tropical storm
- Typhoon Ellie (1994) (T9417, 17W) – Category 1 typhoon which impacted Japan, Northeast China and Korean Peninsula

In the Australian region:

- Cyclone Ellie (2009) – Category 1 tropical cyclone that made landfall in Queensland
- Cyclone Ellie (2022) – Category 1 tropical cyclone that made landfall in Western Australia and Northern Territory

== See also ==
- Storm Goretti (2026) – a European windstorm that was named Elli by the Free University of Berlin.
