= List of storms named Elena =

Atlantic cyclone

The name Elena was used for three tropical cyclones in the Atlantic Ocean:

- Hurricane Elena (1965), never threatened land.
- Tropical Storm Elena (1979), made landfall in Texas as a weak tropical storm, causing $10 million in damage and two fatalities.
- Hurricane Elena (1985), an unpredictable and damaging Category 3 hurricane which made landfall in Mississippi causing $1.3 billion (1985 USD) in damage.

Following the hurricane in 1985, the name Elena was retired and replaced with Erika for the 1991 season.
