= List of storms named Elisa =

The name Elisa has been used for one tropical cyclone in the South-West Indian Ocean and one in the South Pacific Ocean.

In the South-West Indian Ocean:

- Tropical Storm Elisa (1966) – a moderate tropical storm that existed in the Australian region as Cyclone Clara

In the South Pacific:

- Cyclone Elisa (2008) – a Category 2 tropical cyclone that affected Tonga and Niue

== See also ==
- List of storms named Elsa – a similar name used in the South-West Indian Ocean, South Pacific Ocean, and Atlantic Ocean.
