= List of storms named Elsie =

The name Elsie has been used for fourteen tropical cyclones in the Western Pacific Ocean, one in the Australian region, and one in the South-West Indian Ocean.

In the Western Pacific:

- Typhoon Elsie (1950) (T5032) – a Category 1-equivalent typhoon.
- Typhoon Elsie (1954) (T5402) – a Category 3-equivalent typhoon that affected Hong Kong.
- Typhoon Elsie (1958) (T5816) – a Category 1-equivalent typhoon.
- Typhoon Elsie (1961) (T6110) – a Category 1-equivalent typhoon.
- Typhoon Elsie (1964) (T6412, Lusing) – a Category 3-equivalent typhoon that made landfall in Luzon, causing extensive flooding in Manila.
- Typhoon Elsie (1966) (T6619, Pitang) – a Category 4-equivalent typhoon that caused record-breaking rainfall in Taiwan.
- Typhoon Elsie (1969) (T6921, Narsing) – a Category 5-equivalent super typhoon that affected Taiwan and China, killing 102 people.
- Typhoon Elsie (1972) (T7220) – a Category 1-equivalent typhoon that caused flooding in Thailand.
- Typhoon Elsie (1975) (T7514, Mameng) – a Category 4-equivalent typhoon that affected Hong Kong.
- Typhoon Elsie (1981) (T8126, Tasing) – a Category 5-equivalent super typhoon that affected the Caroline Islands and the Mariana Islands.
- Tropical Storm Elsie (1985) (T8502) – the first January tropical cyclone in the Western Pacific in six years.
- Tropical Storm Elsie (1988) (T8814) – did not affect land.
- Typhoon Elsie (1989) (Tasing) – a Category 5-equivalent super typhoon that made landfall in Luzon, killing 47 people.
- Typhoon Elsie (1992) (T9229, Reming) – a Category 5-equivalent super typhoon that affected the Caroline Islands and the Mariana Islands.

In the South-West Indian Ocean:

- Tropical Storm Elsie (1998) – a severe tropical storm.

In the Australian region:

- Cyclone Elsie (1987) – a Category 4 severe tropical cyclone that made landfall in Western Australia.

== See also ==
- List of storms named Elsa – a similar name that has been used in the South-West Indian Ocean and two other tropical cyclone basins.
