= List of storms named Eunice =

The name Eunice was used for two tropical cyclones worldwide: one in the Western Pacific Ocean and one in the South-West Indian Ocean. Eunice was also used as one of the named storms during the 2021–2022 European windstorm season:

In the Western Pacific:

- Typhoon Dolores-Eunice (1948) – a weak tropical storm that affected Japan.

In the South-West Indian Ocean:

- Cyclone Eunice (2015) – a powerful tropical cyclone that remained at sea.

In Western Europe:

- Storm Eunice (2022), (known as Storm Zeynep in Germany and Storm Nora in Denmark), an intense extratropical cyclone that was part of the 2021–2022 European windstorm season.
