= List of storms named Ernie =

The name Ernie was used for four tropical cyclones worldwide: one in the Western Pacific Ocean, two in the Australian region and one in the South Pacific Ocean.

In the Western Pacific:

- Tropical Storm Ernie (1996) – a weak tropical storm made landfall Philippines killed 24 people and caused $5.1 million in damages.

In the Australian region:

- Cyclone Ernie (1989) – a weak tropical cyclone minimal impact Solomon Islands.
- Cyclone Ernie (2017) – one of the quickest strengthening tropical cyclones on record.

In the South Pacific Ocean:

- Cyclone Ernie (1978) – a strong tropical cyclone affected Fiji.
