= List of storms named Ed =

The name Ed was used for five tropical cyclones in the Northwestern Pacific Ocean:

- Tropical Storm Ed (1980) – a weak tropical storm that minimal affected Philippines.
- Typhoon Ed (1984) – a Category 3 typhoon that made landfall Eastern China.
- Tropical Depression Ed (1987) – a weak tropical depression that never threatened land.
- Typhoon Ed (1990) – a Category 2 typhoon that affected Northern Philippines and Vietnam.
- Typhoon Ed (1993) – a Category 5 typhoon that never threatened land.
