= List of storms named Enteng =

The name Enteng has been used for six tropical cyclones in the Philippine Area of Responsibility by PAGASA in the Western Pacific Ocean.

- Severe Tropical Storm Omais (2004) (T0403, 06W, Enteng) – stayed at sea.
- Typhoon Nakri (2008) (T0805, 06W, Enteng) – a very strong typhoon that didn't affect land.
- Severe Tropical Storm Khanun (2012) (T1207, 08W, Enteng) – the first tropical cyclone to directly impact Korea in two years.
- Typhoon Namtheun (2016) (T1612, 15W, Enteng) – a mild typhoon that affected Japan.
- Tropical Storm Jangmi (2020) (T2005, 05W, Enteng) – a minimal storm that affected Korea.
- Typhoon Yagi (2024) (T2411, 12W, Enteng) – a strong typhoon that ravaged the Philippines, Hainan, and Northern Vietnam.

The name Enteng was retired following the 2024 Pacific typhoon season and was replaced with Edring.
