= List of storms named Erick =

The name Erick, or Eric, has been used for ten tropical cyclones worldwide: eight in the Eastern North Pacific Ocean, one in the South-West Indian Ocean, and one in the South Pacific Ocean.

In the Eastern Pacific:

- Tropical Storm Erick (1983) – strong tropical storm well offshore of Mexico
- Tropical Storm Erick (1989) – never impacted land
- Tropical Storm Erick (1995) – strong tropical storm well offshore of Mexico
- Tropical Storm Erick (2001) – churned in the open ocean
- Tropical Storm Erick (2007) – short-lived, never threatened land
- Hurricane Erick (2013) – Category 1 hurricane that brushed the coast of southwestern Mexico
- Hurricane Erick (2019) – Category 4 hurricane that moved well to the south of Hawaii
- Hurricane Erick (2025) – Category 4 hurricane that made landfall in western Oaxaca

In the South-West Indian:

- Tropical Storm Eric (2009) – brushed the coast of Madagascar

In the South Pacific:

- Cyclone Eric (1985) – deadly system that impacted Vanuatu, Fiji, and Tonga
