= List of storms named Eli =

The name Eli has been used to name two tropical cyclones in the West Pacific Ocean:

- Typhoon Eli (1992) – struck the Philippines and Hainan during mid-July 1992.
- Tropical Storm Eli (1995) – a weak tropical storm with no impacts on land.

== See also ==
Storms with similar names

- Tropical Storm Ela (2015) – a Central Pacific tropical storm.
- Hurricane Ele (2002) – a Category 3 Central Pacific hurricane that crossed into the West Pacific Ocean.
- Storm Davide (2025) – a European windstorm that was named Elias by the Free University of Berlin (FU Berlin).
- Storm Goretti (2026) – a European windstorm that was named Elli by the FU Berlin.
- Cyclone Epi (2003) – a Category 1 Australian region tropical cyclone that was named by Papua New Guinea's National Weather Service.
