= List of storms named Elvis =

The name Elvis was used for one tropical cyclone in the Northwestern Pacific Ocean and one in the South-West Indian Ocean.

In the Northwestern Pacific Ocean:

- Tropical Storm Elvis (1998) (T9814, 23W, Miding) – a weak tropical storm which devastated Vietnam, claiming 49 lives.

In the South-West Indian:

- Tropical Storm Elvis (2025) – a weak tropical storm that affected in Madagascar.
