= List of storms named Eloise =

The name Eloise has been used for two tropical cyclones worldwide: one in the Atlantic Ocean and one in the South-West Indian Ocean.

In the Atlantic:

- Hurricane Eloise (1975) – Category 3 hurricane that caused torrential rains and strong winds on the islands of Puerto Rico and Hispaniola, Cuba and the coast of the United States, causing extensive flooding that caused severe damage and the death of more than 80 people.

The name Eloise was retired by the U.S. Weather Bureau following the 1975 season.

In the South-West Indian:

- Cyclone Eloise (2021) – traversed Madagascar as a moderate tropical storm, then peaked as a Category 2-equivalent tropical cyclone on the Saffir–Simpson scale as it began moving ashore in Mozambique
