= List of storms named Evelyn =

The name Evelyn has been used for one tropical cyclone in the Atlantic Ocean and one in the South-West Indian Ocean.

In the Atlantic:

- Hurricane Evelyn (1977) – a Category 1 that mainly impacted Atlantic Canada and hit Bermuda as a tropical storm.

In the South-West Indian:

- Tropical Depression Evelyn (1966) – a weak tropical depression that remained at sea.
