= Cyclone Elaine =

Category 4 Australian region cyclone in 1999

Severe Tropical Cyclone Elaine
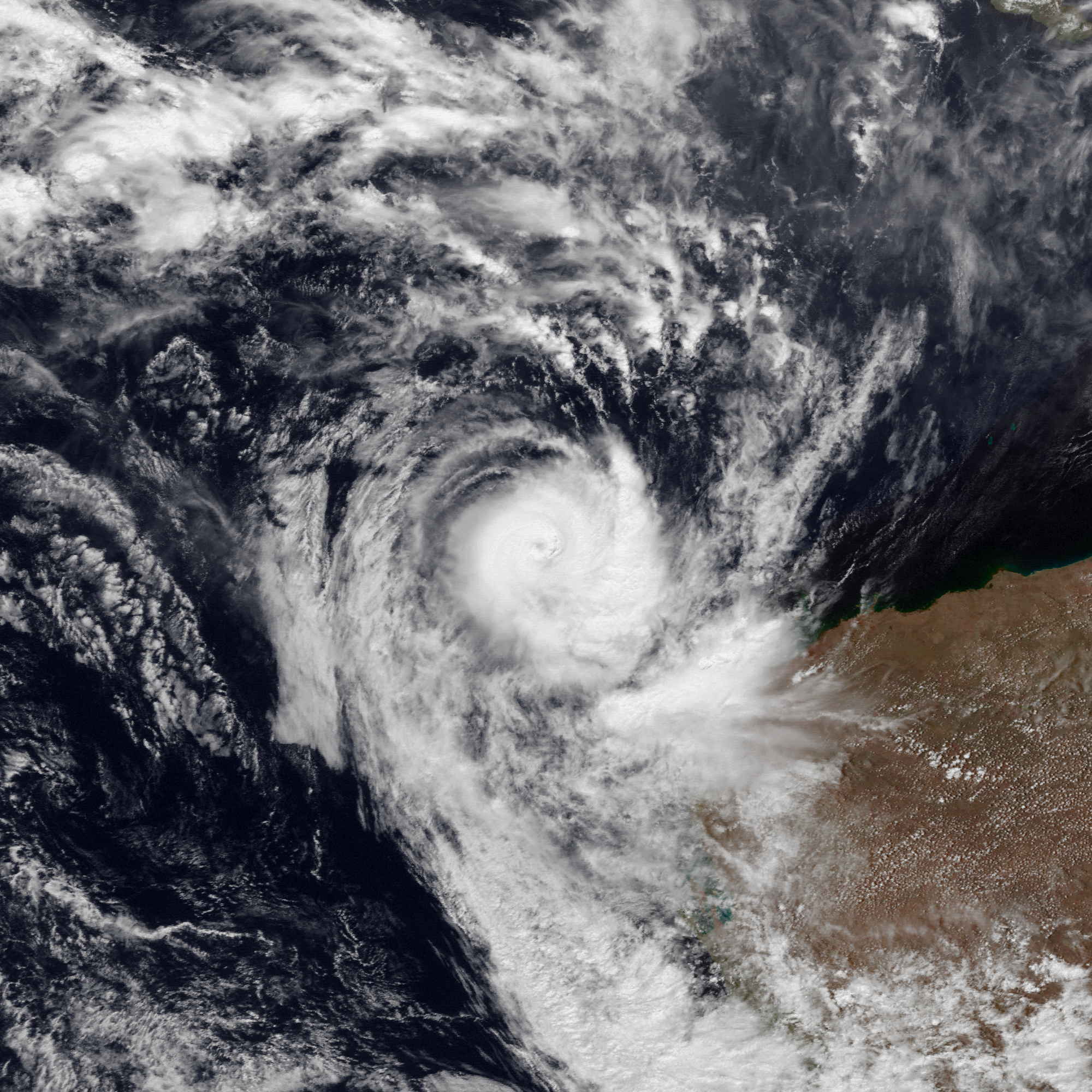
- Cyclone Elaine on 18 March, near Western Australia, Australia

Meteorological history
- Formed: 15 March 1999
- Remnant low: 20 March 1999
- Dissipated: 20 March 1999

Category 4 severe tropical cyclone
- 10-minute sustained (BOM)
- Highest winds: 165 km/h (105 mph)
- Highest gusts: 230 km/h (145 mph)
- Lowest pressure: 945 hPa (mbar); 27.91 inHg

Category 3-equivalent tropical cyclone
- 1-minute sustained (SSHWS/JTWC)
- Highest winds: 185 km/h (115 mph)
- Lowest pressure: 944 hPa (mbar); 27.88 inHg

Overall effects
- Fatalities: 1
- Damage: Minimal
- Areas affected: Western Australia
- Part of the 1998–99 Australian region cyclone season

Severe Tropical Cyclone Elaine was a severe tropical cyclone which formed in the 1998–99 Australian region cyclone season. Elaine, along with Cyclone Vance, both made landfall and caused destruction in Western Australia. Elaine had made landfall on 20 March, while Vance made landfall on 23 March.

Elaine formed after a monsoon trough, which spawned an area of low-pressure on 12 March. The low moved west into a favourable environment and intensified into Tropical Cyclone Elaine on 15 March. 24 hours later, on 16 March, Elaine attained severe tropical cyclone status. Two days later, Elaine reached its peak of 185 kilometres per hour (115 mph). Thereafter, the storm entered a period of weakening. On 20 March, Elaine was downgraded to a tropical cyclone. Elaine made landfall over Western Australia with 56 kilometres per hour (35 mph) winds. More than 1,000 people were evacuated from the areas of impact. Elaine degenerated into a remnant low, a few hours after impact.

== Meteorological history ==
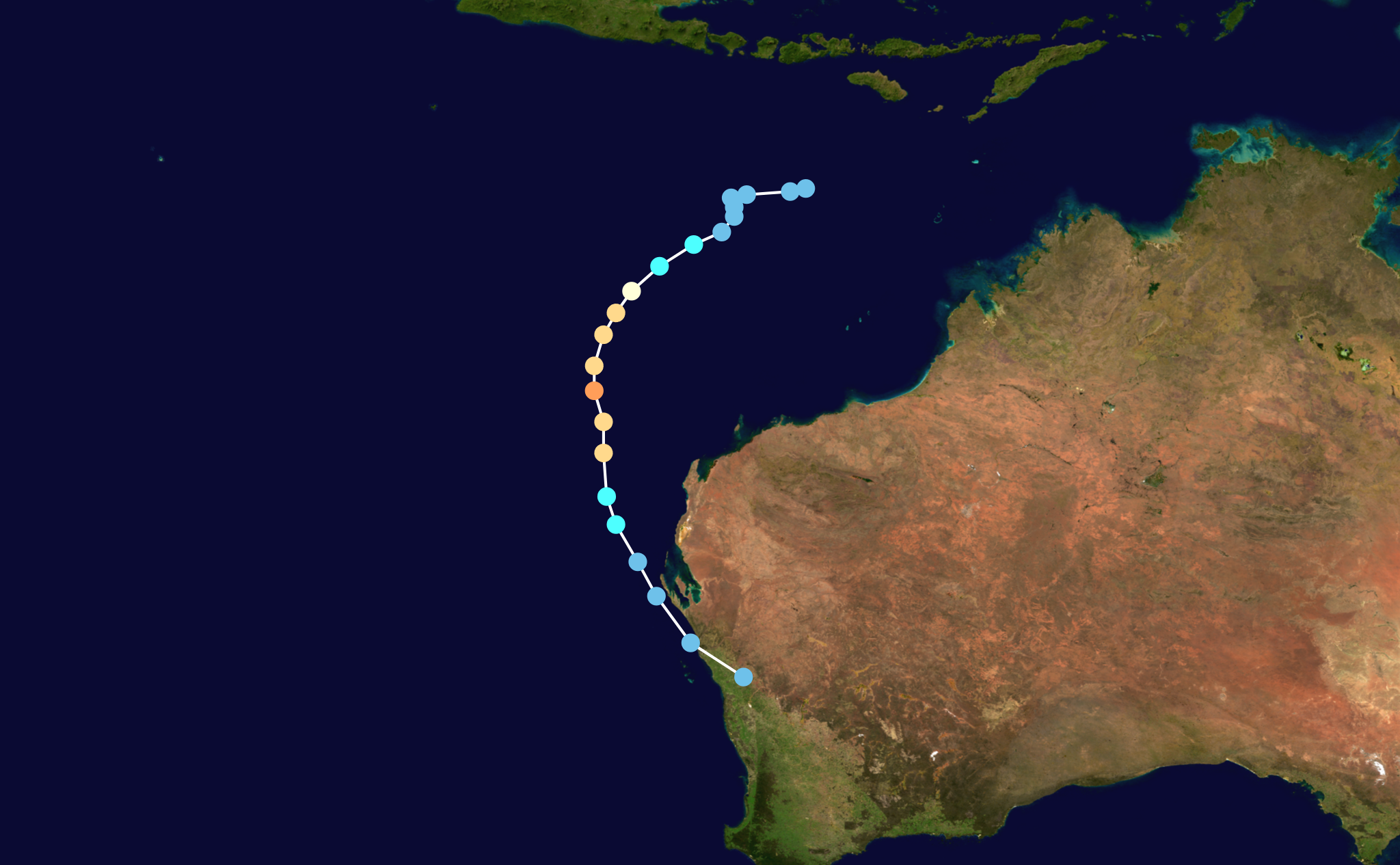
Map plotting the storm's track and intensity, according to the Saffir–Simpson scale Map key Saffir–Simpson scale Tropical depression (≤38 mph, ≤62 km/h) Tropical storm (39–73 mph, 63–118 km/h) Category 1 (74–95 mph, 119–153 km/h) Category 2 (96–110 mph, 154–177 km/h) Category 3 (111–129 mph, 178–208 km/h) Category 4 (130–156 mph, 209–251 km/h) Category 5 (≥157 mph, ≥252 km/h) Unknown Storm type Tropical cyclone Subtropical cyclone Extratropical cyclone, remnant low, tropical disturbance, or monsoon depression

A monsoon trough had formed from a monsoon on 11 March 1999. While the trough moved westward, it spawned a low on 12 March. The low was in a region of low shear and favorable upper outflow. As the low headed westward, it entered a favorable environment and underwent intensification. On 15 March, the storm attained wind speeds more than 56 kilometres per hour (35 mph) and was designated as Tropical Cyclone 28S. On 16 March, at 3:00 PM, the storm had intensified into a tropical cyclone and was designate as Tropical Cyclone Elaine.

Elaine changed course and headed southward, towards Western Australia at 11 knots (20 km/h; 13 mph). Elaine's winds reached 60 mph, attaining Category 1 status. The system underwent explosive intensification and reached severe tropical storm status on 17 March. An eye was evident which was associated with the rapid intensification. Cyclone Elaine reached its peak the same day at 10:00 UTC. Thereafter the storm declined as it headed south towards westerly wind shear.

Elaine continued west on 18 March, and made landfall at 10:00 UTC. Elaine then dropped to tropical storm status, with deep convection being stripped away from the system. Elaine declined over Western Australia as a remnant low. The low continued to impact Western Australia until Elaine dissipated on 20 March, around 12:00 UTC.

== Preparations ==
Nearly 2,000 people were evacuated from Moora after Elaine hit.

== Impact ==
As a tropical depression/low, Elaine affected mainly Western Australia. Moora reported severe flooding and much precipitation. Tropical Low Elaine crossed between Kalbarri and Geraldton around 01:00 UTC. Many emergency operations were in hand, but no fatalities from the storm were reported.

The Moora River experienced flooding after an increase in water capacity. The Moora overflowed to the point where it burst its banks. The downpour of rain was one of the heaviest that Moora had ever seen.

== Retirement ==
Due to the damage and flooding of Moora and the Moore River, the name Elaine was retired and replaced with Emma in 2006, which would affect the same area and do more than $700,000 (2006 USD).

== See also ==
- 1998–99 Australian region cyclone season
- Severe Tropical Cyclone Vance
- Cyclone Seroja
