= Hurricane Erick (2013) =

Category 1 Pacific hurricane in 2013

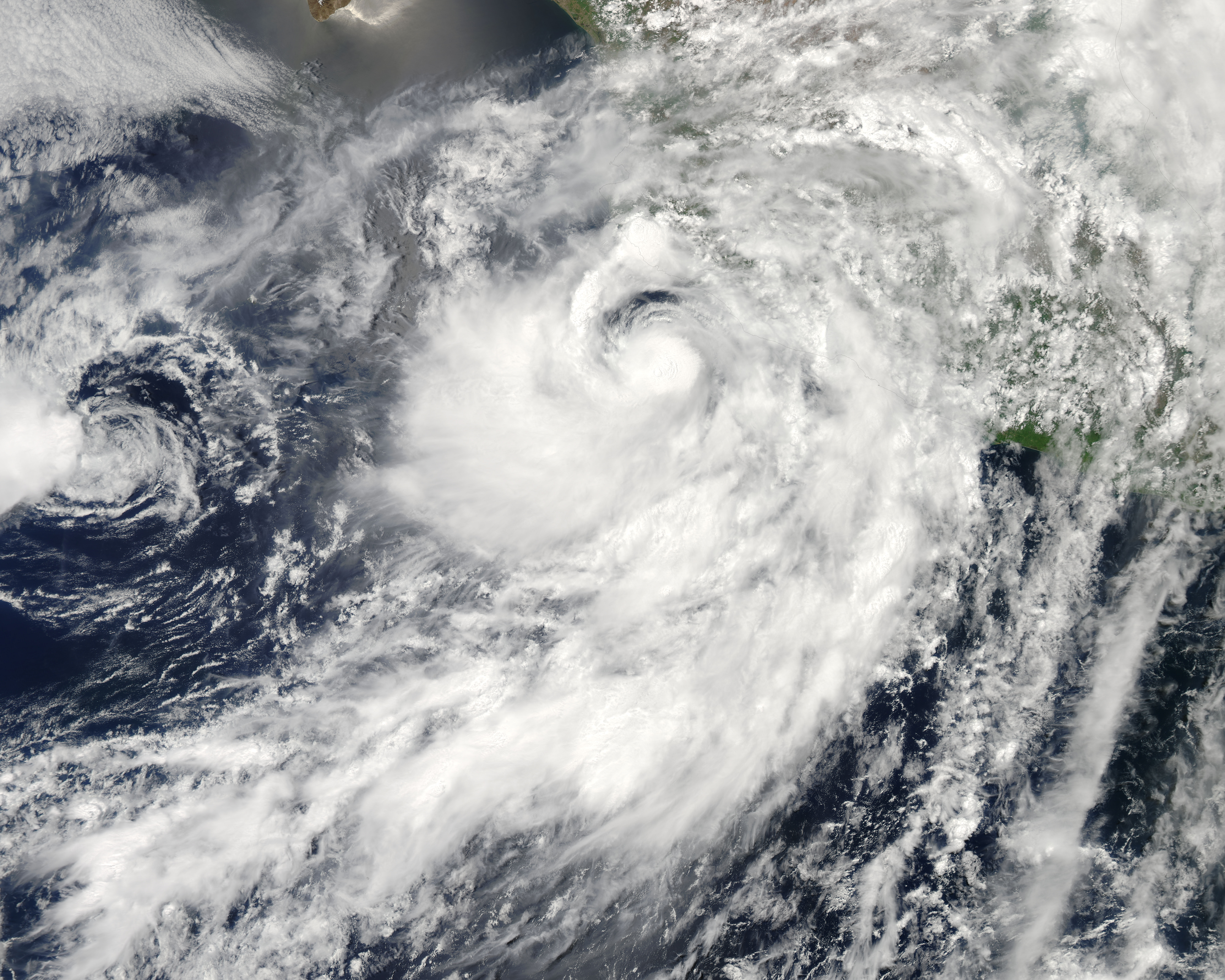
- Erick at peak intensity on July 6, with Tropical Depression Dalila to the west

Meteorological history
- Formed: July 4, 2013
- Dissipated: July 9, 2013

Category 1 hurricane
- 1-minute sustained (SSHWS/NWS)
- Highest winds: 80 mph (130 km/h)
- Lowest pressure: 983 mbar (hPa); 29.03 inHg

Overall effects
- Fatalities: 2
- Missing: 2
- Damage: $30.3 million (2013 USD)
- Areas affected: Southwestern Mexico, Western Mexico, Baja California Peninsula
- IBTrACS
- Part of the 2013 Pacific hurricane season

Hurricane Erick was a fairly strong tropical cyclone that brought moderate impacts to the western coastline of Mexico in July 2013, and was the last of a succession of four Category 1 hurricanes to affect the Pacific coast of Mexico early in the 2013 Pacific hurricane season. The fifth named storm and fourth hurricane of the annual hurricane season, Erick originated from a tropical wave that moved off the western coast of Africa on June 18. The wave tracked swiftly westward with little development, emerging into the eastern Pacific on July 1. As a result of favorable environmental conditions, the wave developed into a tropical depression on July 4, and further into Tropical Storm Erick at 00:00 UTC on July 5. Steered generally west-northwest, Erick intensified into a Category 1 hurricane and reached its peak intensity with one-minute maximum sustained winds of 80 mph (130 km/h) on July 6. Its proximity to land and track over increasingly cooler waters caused the storm to deteriorate into a tropical storm the following day, though it remained at such intensity until degenerating into a remnant low early on July 9. The remnant circulation dissipated a few hours later, southwest of Baja California Sur.

In anticipation of Erick, numerous tropical cyclone warnings and watches were issued for various portions of the coastline of Mexico. Ports were closed and residents in low-lying areas were asked to evacuate to higher grounds. In addition, shipping by means of boat was suspended. Though the center of Erick remained offshore, the outer bands of the system brought gusty winds and isolated heavy rainfall to Western Mexico. In Guerrero, minor flooding was reported in the cities of Acapulco and Puerto Marques. A river overflowed its banks in Nayarit, flooding several cities in the state. Numerous cars, streets, and homes were damaged by flooding. A woman died as she attempted to flee her house, while a man was killed after being swept away by the river. Hundreds of people were rescued by the Mexican military and Nayarit officials. Across Baja California Sur, the storm produced widespread precipitation, leading to flooding.

== Meteorological history ==
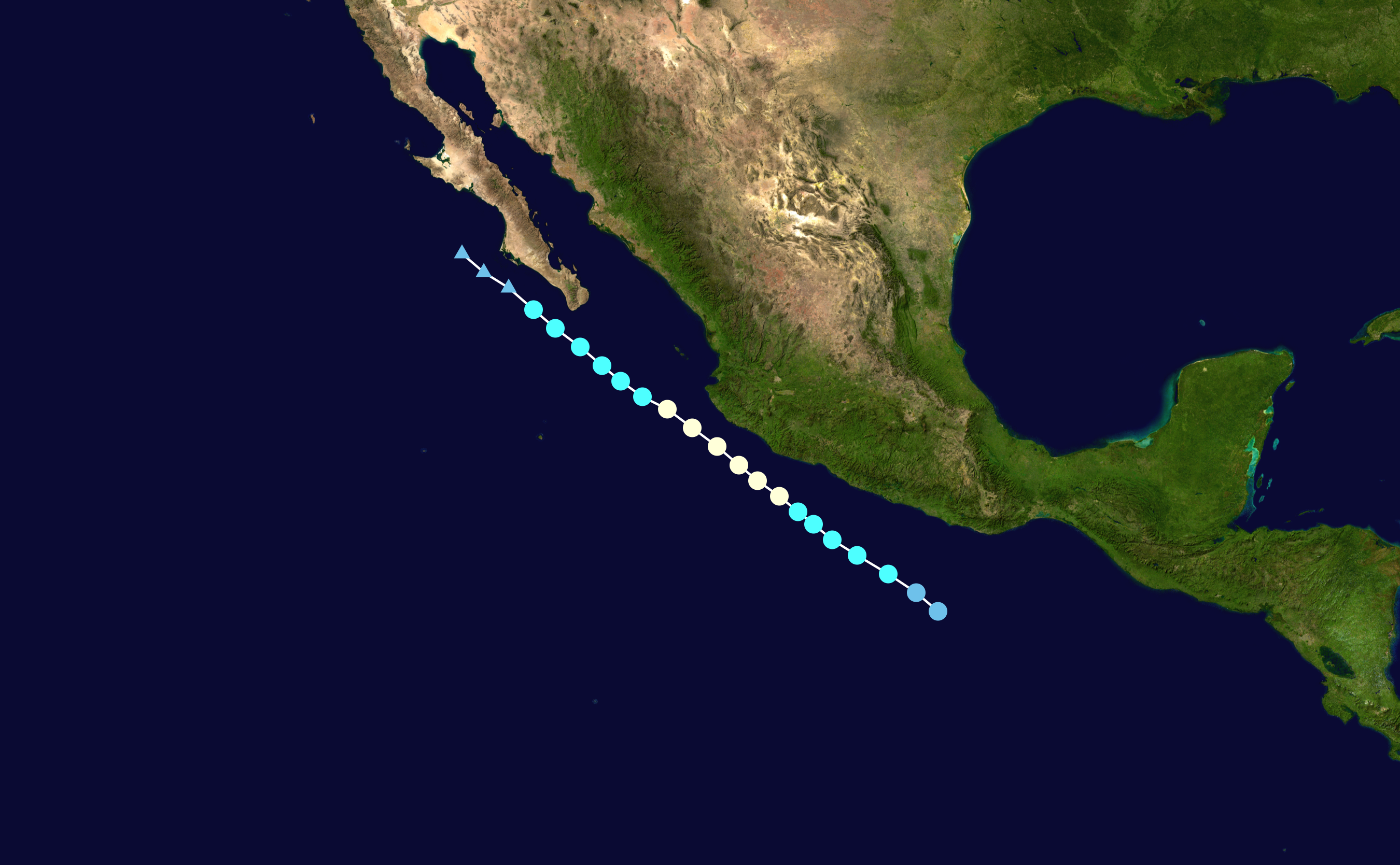
Map plotting the storm's track and intensity, according to the Saffir–Simpson scale Map key Saffir–Simpson scale Tropical depression (≤38 mph, ≤62 km/h) Tropical storm (39–73 mph, 63–118 km/h) Category 1 (74–95 mph, 119–153 km/h) Category 2 (96–110 mph, 154–177 km/h) Category 3 (111–129 mph, 178–208 km/h) Category 4 (130–156 mph, 209–251 km/h) Category 5 (≥157 mph, ≥252 km/h) Unknown Storm type Tropical cyclone Subtropical cyclone Extratropical cyclone, remnant low, tropical disturbance, or monsoon depression

On June 18, a tropical wave emerged off the western coastline of Africa and into the eastern Atlantic. Tracking steadily westward, it maintained a small but organized area of convection—shower and thunderstorm activity—along its axis for the next several days. The wave crossed the Lesser Antilles on June 24 and Central America on June 29, emerging into the eastern Pacific shortly thereafter. During the evening of July 1, the National Hurricane Center (NHC) began monitoring the system, noting that environmental conditions were expected to become favorable for slow development. The wave interacted with a larger area of low pressure on July 2, leading to an increase in convective coverage and the formation of a broad low-pressure area. Continuing slowly westward, the system acquired enough organization to be classified as a tropical depression at 12:00 UTC on July 4 while centered about 205 mi (330 km) southeast of Acapulco, Mexico. Despite the initially exposed center of circulation, a byproduct of moderate wind shear, the depression soon began to organize as convective banding increased and gained more curvature. This led to the classification of Tropical Storm Erick at 00:00 UTC on July 5.

Under the influence of a mid-level ridge over the northwestern Caribbean Sea and an upper-level ridge over the southwestern United States, the newly upgraded Erick tracked west-northwest parallel to the coastline of Mexico. A central dense overcast formed by the daylight hours of July 5, with tight banding noted on satellite. In addition, microwave imagery indicated the formative stages of an eyewall. Initially vertically decoupled, the storm became more vertically aligned throughout the following hours. A ragged eye became intermittently visible on satellite, and Erick was upgraded to Category 1 hurricane status at 06:00 UTC, located approximately 105 mi (169 km) west-southwest of Lázaro Cárdenas, Mexico. In conjunction with satellite intensity estimates, it is estimated that Erick attained its peak intensity with maximum sustained winds of 80 mph (130 km/h) and a minimum barometric pressure of 983 mbar (29.03 inHg) at 12:00 UTC. Shortly thereafter, its proximity to the coastline of Mexico and track over increasingly cooler waters caused the storm to begin a weakening trend. At 18:00 UTC on July 7, Erick weakened to a tropical storm as its associated convective mass warmed and the eye deteriorated. Wind shear caused the center of circulation to become exposed on July 9 as the system passed just south of Baja California Sur, leading to degeneration into a remnant low-pressure area at 06:00 UTC. The remnant vortex persisted for several more hours, before dissipating over cold sea surface temperatures at 00:00 UTC on July 10.

== Preparations and impact ==
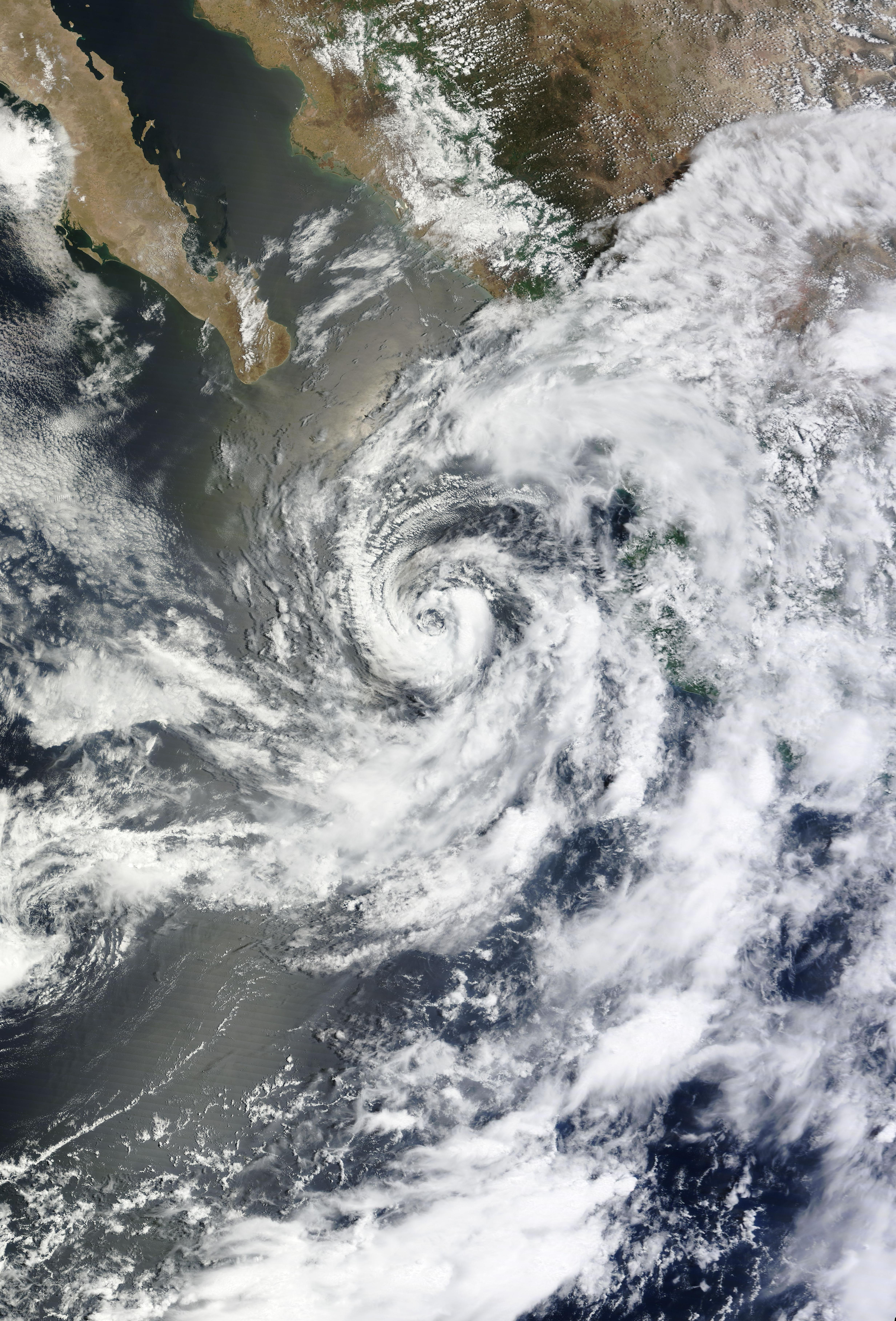
Tropical Storm Erick weakening offshore Jalisco on July 7

Following the system's designation, a tropical storm watch was issued for the southwestern coastline of Mexico stretching from Acapulco to La Fortuna. By 03:00 UTC on July 5, the watch was extended from Acapulco to Manzanillo, while a tropical storm warning was issued from Lázaro Cárdenas to Manzanillo. Several hours later, the watch was discontinued for the coastline stretching from Acapulco to Lázaro Cárdenas and issued from La Fortuna to Cabo Corrientes, Jalisco. Meanwhile, the warning from Lázaro Cárdenas to Manzanillo was discontinued, with a new warning issued from Zihuatanejo to La Fortuna. All tropical storm watches in effect were discontinued by 03:00 UTC the following morning, with the warning being extended from Zihuatanejo to Cabo Corrientes. After being upgraded to a hurricane, Erick prompted the issuance of hurricane watches stretching from Punta San Telmo to Cabo Corrientes. At 15:00 UTC on July 6, a tropical storm watch was issued from Santa Fe to La Paz, though this was upgraded to a warning several hours later. Following many other revisions, all tropical cyclone watches and warnings were discontinued after Erick degenerated into a remnant low early on July 9.

In preparation for the tropical cyclone, an "orange" alert was issued for southern Michoacán, southern Jalisco, and the entire state of Colima, while a "yellow" alert was posted for the rest of the Jalisco coastline. The ports of Acapulco, Zihuatanejo, and Manzanillio were closed. In fear of flash flooding, residents along low-lying areas of Acapulco were urged to evacuate. Meanwhile, the government of Michoacán ordered the suspension of shipping by boat.

Despite remaining offshore, the outer rainbands of the storm affected the southwestern coastline with gusty winds and heavy rainfall, with similar effects farther northwest. In Acapulco and Puerto Marques, the storm was responsible for minor flooding. Elsewhere across the state, damage was minor and mostly due to landslides. Along the coast of Colima, waves up to 9 ft (2.7 m) were recorded. Although some flooding was reported across the state, damage was considered minor.

Further north, Erick brought extensive flood damage to Nayarit. A 74-year-old woman died while trying to escape her flooded house, while dozens of vehicles were damaged and several other streets and homes were flooded. One river overflowed its banks, affecting numerous cities. Officials in Nayarit attempted to rescue hundreds of people affected by Hurricane Erick, many of whom waited on streets to be rescued. Dozens of families were directly affected by the storm. Substantial amounts of debris piled up on streets. Residents reported severe economical losses, especially in Xalisco, where a disaster declaration was necessary. Offshore, a waterspout was reported. In Tepic, Governor Roberto Sandoval ordered a state of emergency. Damages from the storm in Nayarit totaled MX$386.4 million (US$30.3 million). Although the core of the system remained offshore, a "yellow" alert was issued for Baja California Sur. Heavy rain was recorded over much of the peninsula, resulting in flooding. The ports of La Paz, Cabo San Lucas, and San Jose del Cabo were closed due to high waves. Additionally, a "green" alert was issued for Baja California. In all, two people were killed while two others were missing.

== See also ==
- Other storms with the same name
- Timeline of the 2013 Pacific hurricane season
- Tropical Storm Emilia (2006)
- Hurricane Andres (2009)
- Hurricane Carlos (2015)
