= List of storms named Epsilon =

The name Epsilon has been used for two tropical cyclones in the Atlantic Ocean.

- Hurricane Epsilon (2005), Category 1 hurricane that persisted beyond the official November 30 end date of the hurricane season
- Hurricane Epsilon (2020), late-season Category 3 hurricane that tracked east of Bermuda
