= List of storms named Eve =

The name Eve has been used to name three tropical cyclones: one in the Atlantic Ocean and two in the West Pacific Ocean.

In the Atlantic:

- Tropical Storm Eve (1969) – churned the ocean between the Mid-Atlantic U.S. states and Bermuda, remained offshore and caused no impacts in either region.

In the West Pacific:

- Typhoon Eve (1996; T9606) – a Category 5-equivalent super typhoon that made landfall in Japan.
- Tropical Storm Eve (1999) (T9926, 27W, Rening) – tracked northwest across the central Philippines and then made landfall southeast of Da Nang, Vietnam.

== See also ==
- Cyclone Eva (2022) – a South Pacific tropical cyclone with a similar name.
