= List of storms named Evan =

The name Evan has been used to name tropical cyclones 3 times, once within the Australian region and twice within the South Pacific basin.

Australian region

- Tropical Low Evan (2004), which brought flooding to Groote Eylandt and the Northern Territory.

South Pacific

- Cyclone Evan (1997), which impacted waters northeast of New Zealand.
- Cyclone Evan (2012), which impacted Fiji, Western Samoa, American Samoa, Tonga
