= List of storms named Eileen =

The name Eileen has been used for three tropical cyclones in the Eastern Pacific Ocean.

- Hurricane Eileen (1966)
- Tropical Storm Eileen (1970)
- Tropical Storm Eileen (1974)

The name Eileen has also been used for one tropical cyclone in the Western Pacific Ocean.

- Tropical Storm Eileen (1947)

The name Eileen has also been used for one tropical cyclone in the Southwest Indian Ocean.

- Cyclone Eileen (1964)

== See also ==
- Storm Aileen (2017), an alternate spelling of the name used in the UK and Ireland's windstorm naming system.
