= List of storms named Eva =

The name Eva was used for five tropical cyclones worldwide: one in the Western Pacific Ocean, two in the Australian region, one in the South Pacific Ocean and one in the South-West Indian Ocean.

In the Western Pacific:

- Typhoon Eva (1945) – a strong typhoon affected Japan and South Korea.

In the South-West Indian Ocean:

- Tropical Depression Eva (1961) – remained at sea.

In the Australian region:

- Cyclone Eva (1964) – a tropical cyclone that remained at sea.
- Cyclone Eva (1970) – a tropical cyclone that struck northern Australia

In the South Pacific Ocean:

- Cyclone Eva (2022) – a short-lived tropical cyclone that developed near New Caledonia.
