= List of storms named Ellis =

The name Ellis has been used to name four tropical cyclones in the Northwestern Pacific Ocean.

- Typhoon Ellis (1979) (T7906, 06W, Etang) – made landfall on southern China as a tropical storm.
- Typhoon Ellis (1982) (T8213, 14W, Oyang) – weakened before making landfall on Japan.
- Tropical Storm Ellis (1985) (T8523, 22W) – did not significantly affect land.
- Tropical Storm Ellis (1989) (T8906, 06W, Daling) – struck Japan.
