= Typhoon Kai-tak (2000) =

Pacific typhoon in 2000

Typhoon Kai-tak (Edeng)
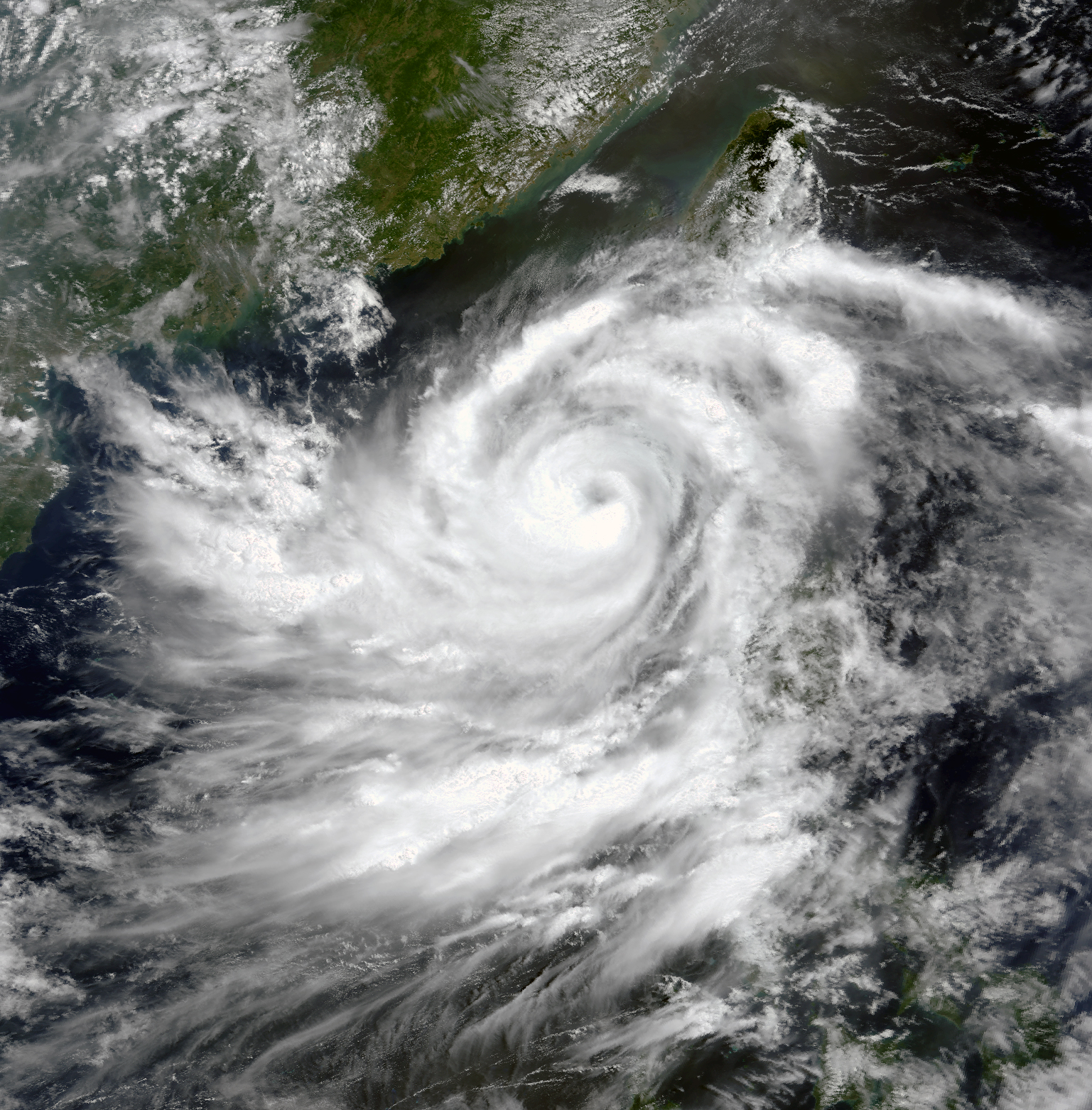
- Kai-tak near peak intensity on July 7

Meteorological history
- Formed: July 3, 2000
- Dissipated: July 10, 2000

Typhoon
- 10-minute sustained (JMA)
- Highest winds: 140 km/h (85 mph)
- Lowest pressure: 960 hPa (mbar); 28.35 inHg

Category 1-equivalent typhoon
- 1-minute sustained (SSHWS/JTWC)
- Highest winds: 140 km/h (85 mph)
- Lowest pressure: 967 hPa (mbar); 28.56 inHg

Overall effects
- Fatalities: 16 direct, 218 indirect
- Economic losses: $82 million (2000 USD)
- Areas affected: Philippines, Taiwan, East China, Korea
- IBTrACS /
- Part of the 2000 Pacific typhoon season

Typhoon Kai-tak, also known in the Philippines as Typhoon Edeng, was a typhoon that formed in early July 2000 and brought severe impacts to the Philippines and Taiwan.

== Meteorological history ==
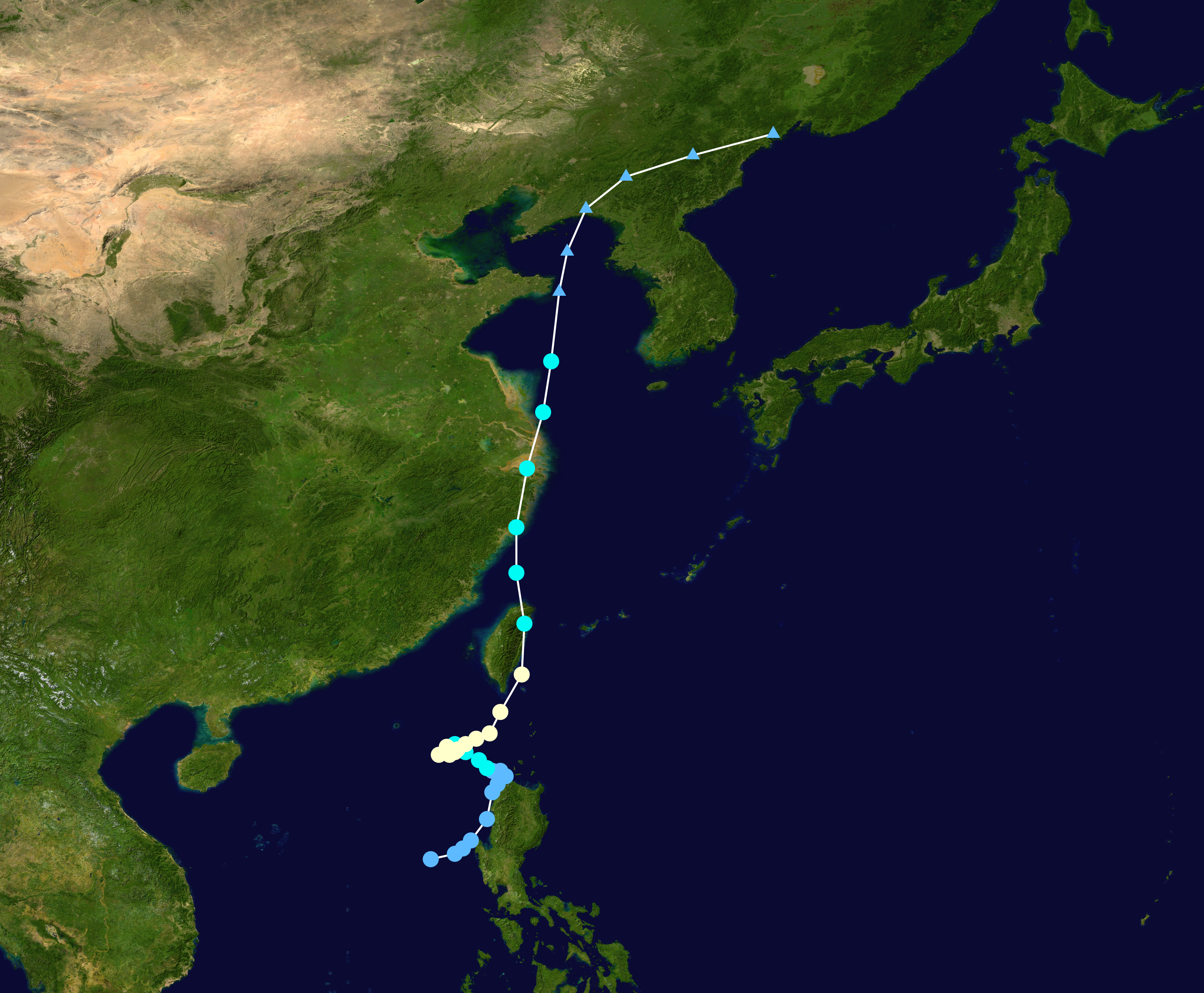
Map plotting the storm's track and intensity, according to the Saffir–Simpson scale Map key Saffir–Simpson scale Tropical depression (≤38 mph, ≤62 km/h) Tropical storm (39–73 mph, 63–118 km/h) Category 1 (74–95 mph, 119–153 km/h) Category 2 (96–110 mph, 154–177 km/h) Category 3 (111–129 mph, 178–208 km/h) Category 4 (130–156 mph, 209–251 km/h) Category 5 (≥157 mph, ≥252 km/h) Unknown Storm type Tropical cyclone Subtropical cyclone Extratropical cyclone, remnant low, tropical disturbance, or monsoon depression

On July 2, a low pressure area formed north west of the Philippines and became a tropical depression on July 3 and started to drift northward, becoming a storm named Kai-tak on the 5th and a typhoon on the 6th. (Note: The name Kai-tak (Cantonese: 啟德, [kʰɐi˧˥ tak˧]) was contributed by Hong Kong and refers to Kai Tak Airport in Cantonese.) Kai-tak continued northward, hitting Taiwan on the 9th. Kai-tak changed to an extratropical cyclone in the Yellow Sea on the 11th. This extratropical cyclone landed near the Dandong City of the Liaodong Peninsula and changed course to the east, and disappeared on the 12th.

== Impact ==
The combined effects of Kai-tak and Tropical Depression Gloring led to the collapse of the Payatas dumpsite, a large garbage pile, devastating a scavenger community with 300 shanty homes near Manila. At least 218 people died in the avalanche – some of whom were decapitated by machinery – and at least 73 others were injured. 160 people were killed and 150 were missing on Luzon due to heavy rain and landslides. In Taiwan, a wind of 80 knots or more when landing caused a power outage of more than 3,000 units, killing one person. The China Meteorological Administration allegedly suffered an economic loss of $82 million in Zhejiang and elsewhere.

== See also ==
- Typhoon Olga (1999)
