= Typhoon Alex (1987) =

Pacific typhoon in 1987

Typhoon Alex (Etang)
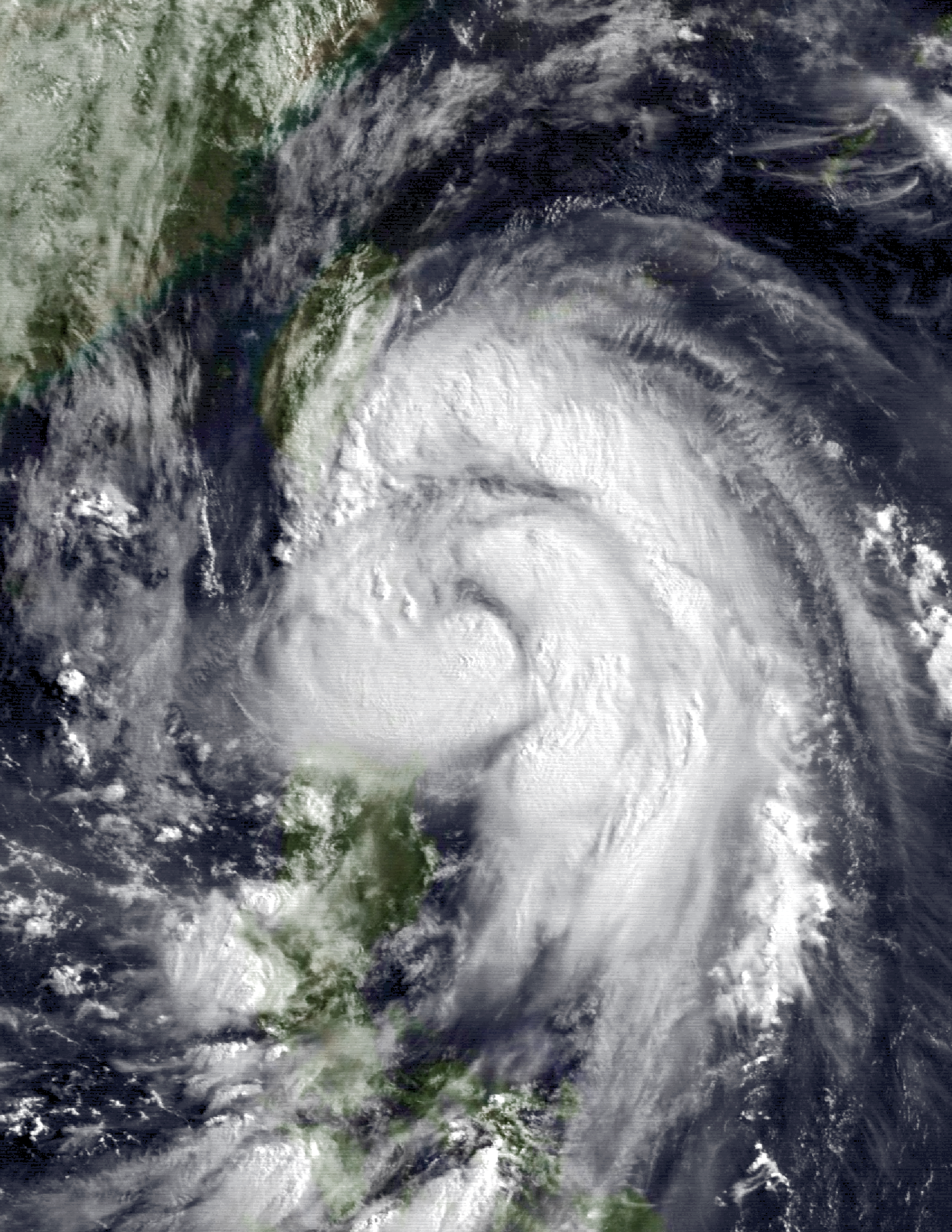
- Typhoon Alex nearing Taiwan at peak intensity on July 26

Meteorological history
- Formed: July 21, 1987
- Dissipated: August 2, 1987

Typhoon
- 10-minute sustained (JMA)
- Highest winds: 120 km/h (75 mph)
- Lowest pressure: 970 hPa (mbar); 28.64 inHg

Category 1-equivalent typhoon
- 1-minute sustained (SSHWS/JTWC)
- Highest winds: 120 km/h (75 mph)

Overall effects
- Fatalities: 126
- Damage: >$1.8 million (1987 USD)
- Areas affected: Taiwan, central China, South Korea
- IBTrACS
- Part of the 1987 Pacific typhoon season

Typhoon Alex, known in the Philippines as Typhoon Etang, affected the Taiwan, China, and South Korea during July 1987. Typhoon Alex developed from the monsoon trough that spawned a tropical disturbance late on July 21 southwest of Guam which organized into a tropical depression shortly thereafter. The system steadily became better organized, and the next day, a tropical depression had developed. Satellite intensity estimates gradually increased, and on July 23, the depression intensified into Tropical Storm Alex. After initially tracking west-northwest, Tropical Storm Alex started tracking northwest. An eye developed on July 24, and on the next day, Alex was classified as a typhoon, when Alex attained its peak intensity of 120 km/h (75 mph) and a minimum barometric pressure of 970 mbar (29 inHg). Alex weakened while tracking more northward, though interaction with Taiwan resulted in a more westward track starting on July 27. The storm struck near Shanghai as a tropical storm, and weakened over land, although it remained identifiable through August 2.

Across Taiwan, the storm inflicted minor damage and one person was killed. In the province of Zhejiang, Alex damaged or destroyed over 200 fishing boats, wiped out 22 bridges, snapped 32 power lines, and flooded four reservoirs. Damage there exceeded US$1.8 million. In Jiaxing, at least 121,405 hectares (300,000 acres) of farmland were flooded. Nation-wide, 125 people were killed and roughly 200 were wounded. Close to 700 homes were demolished while roughly 200 fishing boats were damaged. Across South Korea, the storm dumped heavy rainfall, with daily totals of 300 mm (12 in) in some places, triggering flooding and landslides.

== Meteorological history ==
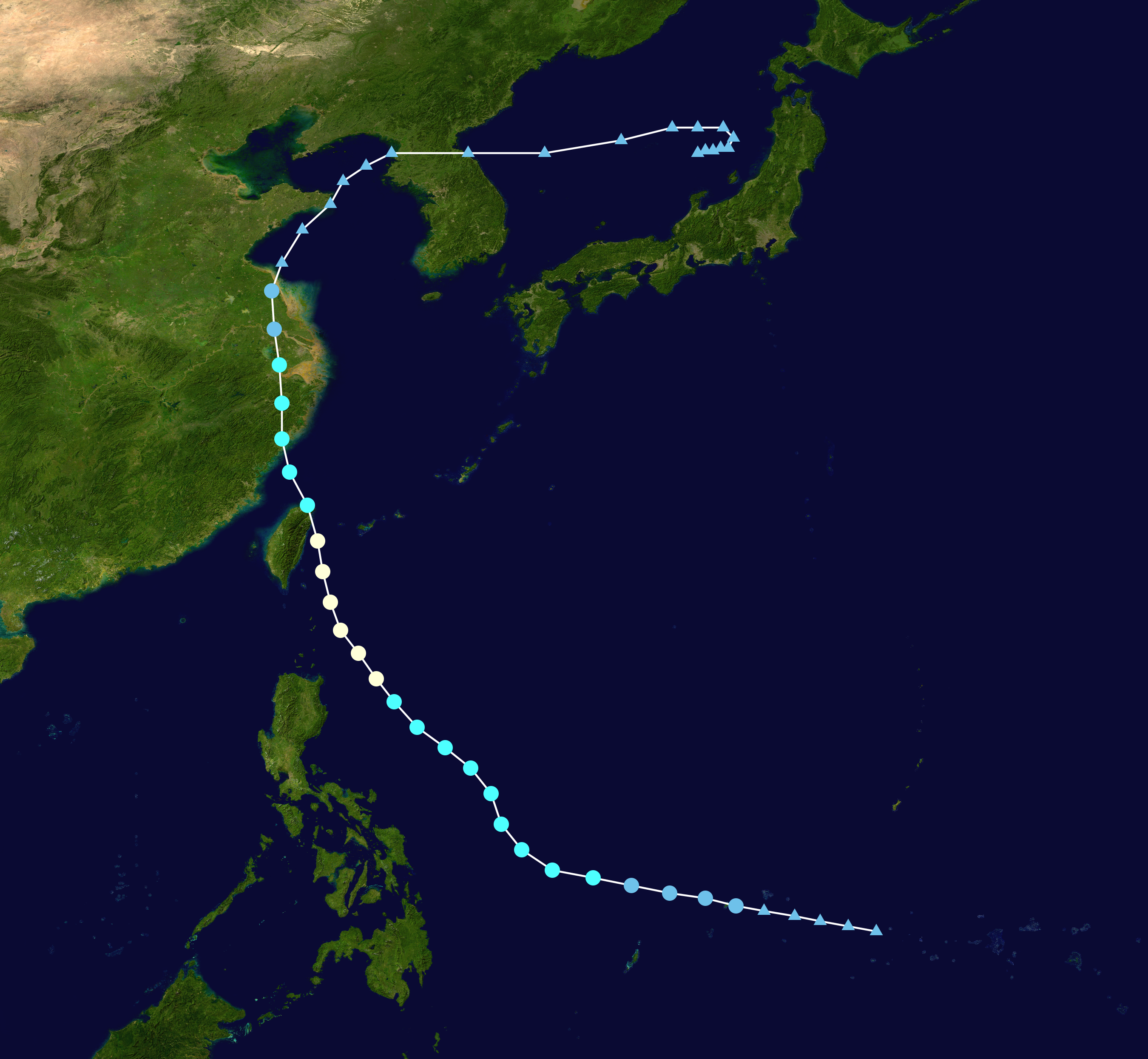
Map plotting the storm's track and intensity, according to the Saffir–Simpson scale Map key Saffir–Simpson scale Tropical depression (≤38 mph, ≤62 km/h) Tropical storm (39–73 mph, 63–118 km/h) Category 1 (74–95 mph, 119–153 km/h) Category 2 (96–110 mph, 154–177 km/h) Category 3 (111–129 mph, 178–208 km/h) Category 4 (130–156 mph, 209–251 km/h) Category 5 (≥157 mph, ≥252 km/h) Unknown Storm type Tropical cyclone Subtropical cyclone Extratropical cyclone, remnant low, tropical disturbance, or monsoon depression

Typhoon Alex developed in the western edge of the Western Pacific monsoon trough which stretched 2,500 km (1,555 mi) near the 10th parallel north from the Carolina Islands to the International Date Line. Late on July 21, satellite imagery first detected a tropical disturbance 370 km (230 mi) to the southwest of Guam, which prompted the Japan Meteorological Agency (JMA) to upgrade the system to a tropical depression. (Note: The Japan Meteorological Agency is the official Regional Specialized Meteorological Center for the western Pacific Ocean.) (Note: Wind estimates from the JMA and most other basins throughout the world are sustained over 10 minutes, while estimates from the United States-based Joint Typhoon Warning Center are sustained over 1 minute. 1 minute winds are about 1.14 times the amount of 10 minute winds.) At 06:00 UTC on the next day, the Joint Typhoon Warning Center (JTWC) began to follow the system as the disturbance had developed curved banding features. A rapid increase in both convection and organization followed, and at 18:00 UTC on July 22, satellite imagery showed the development of a central dense overcast, with Dvorak intensity estimates supporting an intensity of 50 km/h (30 mph). At 19:30 UTC, the JTWC issued a Tropical Cyclone Formation Alert despite satellite imagery only detecting a broad, ill-defined low-level circulation, with a minimum barometric pressure of 1005 mbar (29.68 inHg). By 00:00 UTC on July 23, Dvorak intensity estimates reached T2.5/65 km/h (40 mph) and a ship to the north of the system reported winds of 55 km/h (35 mph), which resulted in the JTWC declaring the system a tropical depression.

Initially, the depression was tracking west and was forecast by the JTWC to track across the Philippine Islands. This was in agreement with most tropical cyclone forecast models showing the storm track across the archipelago and the turning northward in the general direction of China, although the JTWC eventually shifted the track further north into the Luzon Straits. At 06:00 UTC on July 23, the JTWC upgraded the depression into Tropical Storm Alex, with the JMA doing the same six hours later. Late the next evening, the JMA upgraded Alex to a severe tropical storm as satellite images showed the center of the storm moving under the deep convection after previously being exposed to its northeast. Continuing to slowly intensify, Alex turned northwest. It developed an eye between 15:00 UTC and 18:00 UTC on July 24. The next morning the JTWC declared Alex a typhoon while also estimating that the storm attained its peak intensity of 120 km/h (75 mph).

Upon becoming a typhoon, Alex was located 220 km (135 mi) east of the northern tip of Luzon. By this time, most forecast models showed a northward movement east of Taiwan due to a weakness in a subtropical ridge south of Japan and the presence of a surface front across the east coast of Asia. On the evening of July 25, the JMA classified Alex as a typhoon while also reporting that Alex obtained its peak intensity of 120 km/h (75 mph) and a minimum pressure of 970 mbar (29 inHg). Although satellite images continued to depict a warm spot, suggesting the presence of an eye, both the JMA and JTWC estimated that Alex fell below typhoon intensity on July 26; however, according to the JMA, Alex briefly re-intensified back to a typhoon that evening. Alex turned north in response to the aforementioned front, passing 55 km (34 mi) east of Taipei. Interaction with the high terrain of Taiwan caused Alex to deflect west, striking Wenzhou as a weakening tropical storm on the evening of July 27. The storm rapidly dissipated over land according to the JTWC, although the JMA continued to track Alex as a minimal tropical storm when it moved back over open water in the Sea of Japan on the evening of July 28. Even though Alex failed to regenerate according to the JTWC, the JMA continued to track the system as a tropical depression through August 2.

== Impact and aftermath ==
The typhoon first caused slight damage in Taiwan, becoming the second typhoon to affect the country in 1987. A 35-year-old man was crushed to death by a falling wall in Keelung due to strong winds. Air and train services were also disrupted.

Typhoon Alex lashed the Chinese province of Zhejiang for fourteen hours. The storm damaged or demolished more than 200 fishing boats, wiped out 22 bridges, snapped 32 power lines, and flooded four reservoirs. The cities of Wenzhou and Jiaxing were the hardest hit, with as much as 290 mm (11.4 in) of rain falling. Damage in the area exceeded US$1.8 million. In the former, 34 people were killed. In Jiaxing, a minimum of 121,405 ha (300,000 acres) of farmland were flooded. Throughout the suburbs of Shanghai, north of where the storm moved ashore 32 individuals sustained injuries and 400 homes were damaged or destroyed. More than 100 pigs were killed there. One person was killed in a tornado spawned by the typhoon in Shanghai. Overall, 125 people were killed and roughly 200 were wounded. Approximately 700 homes were destroyed along with 27,000 ha (66,720 acres) of crops. Around 200 fishing boats were damaged. Following the storm, local army troops and civilians assisted in rescue work in Zhejiang.

Under the anticipation that Alex would directly strike South Korea, typhoon warnings were posted for the coastline. After forecasts shifted west, the warning was lowered to a high wind warning. Affecting a country inundated by a series of systems that started with Typhoon Thelma, the storm deluged the country with up to 300 mm (12 in) of rainfall in a single day. This resulted in serious flooding, landslides, and loss of life.

== See also ==
- Typhoon Mamie (1985)
- Typhoon Nelson (1985)
