= Tropical Storm Irving (1992) =

Pacific tropical storm in 1992

Severe Tropical Storm Irving (Edeng)
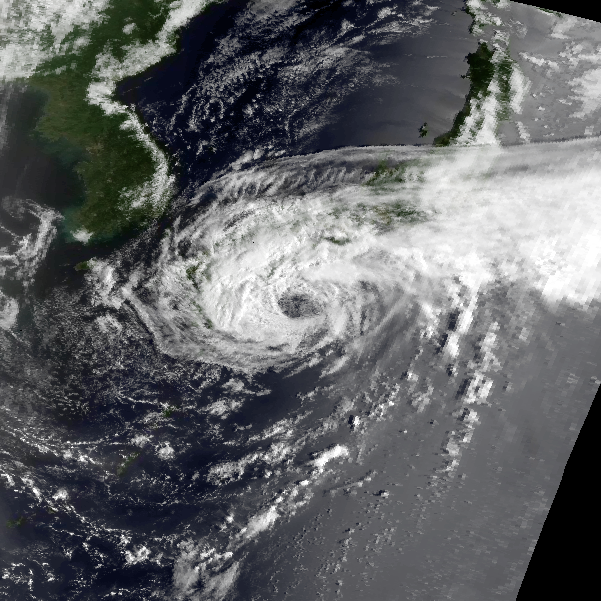
- Irving at peak intensity late on August 3

Meteorological history
- Formed: July 31, 1992
- Dissipated: August 5, 1992

Severe tropical storm
- 10-minute sustained (JMA)
- Highest winds: 100 km/h (65 mph)
- Lowest pressure: 980 hPa (mbar); 28.94 inHg

Category 1-equivalent typhoon
- 1-minute sustained (SSHWS/JTWC)
- Highest winds: 150 km/h (90 mph)
- Lowest pressure: 975 hPa (mbar); 28.79 inHg

Overall effects
- Fatalities: 2 confirmed
- Missing: 3
- Damage: $4.74 million (1992 USD)
- Areas affected: Japan
- IBTrACS
- Part of the 1992 Pacific typhoon season

Severe Tropical Storm Irving, known in the Philippines as Tropical Depression Edeng, was an early-season tropical cyclone that struck southern Japan during August 1992. A distinct but weak low-pressure area developed within the Western Pacific monsoon trough. A tropical depression formed on July 31, and following an increase in both organization and thunderstorm activity, the depression attained tropical storm intensity on the morning of August 2. After tracking west-northwest and then north, Irving turned to the northeast, and attained peak intensity a day later. In response to a subtropical ridge to the north, the system began to track west-northwestward, and made landfall at maximum intensity over southwestern Shikoku at peak intensity. Irving turned sharply to the west and rapidly weakened, dissipating over the Korea Strait at noon on August 5.

Tropical Storm Irving was the first of two successive systems to move over the Japanese archipelago. Two people were reported missing in Wakayama prefecture. A swimmer was reported missing and two other people were killed offshore Kyōtango due to high waves. Overall, 51 flights linking Osaka and Shikoku were cancelled while ferry services between the Kansai region and Shikoku were also suspended. Damage was estimated at 601 million (US$4.74 million). (Note: All currencies are converted from Japanese yen to United States Dollars using this with an exchange rate of the year 1992.) (Note: All damage totals are in 1992 values of their respective currencies.)

== Meteorological history ==
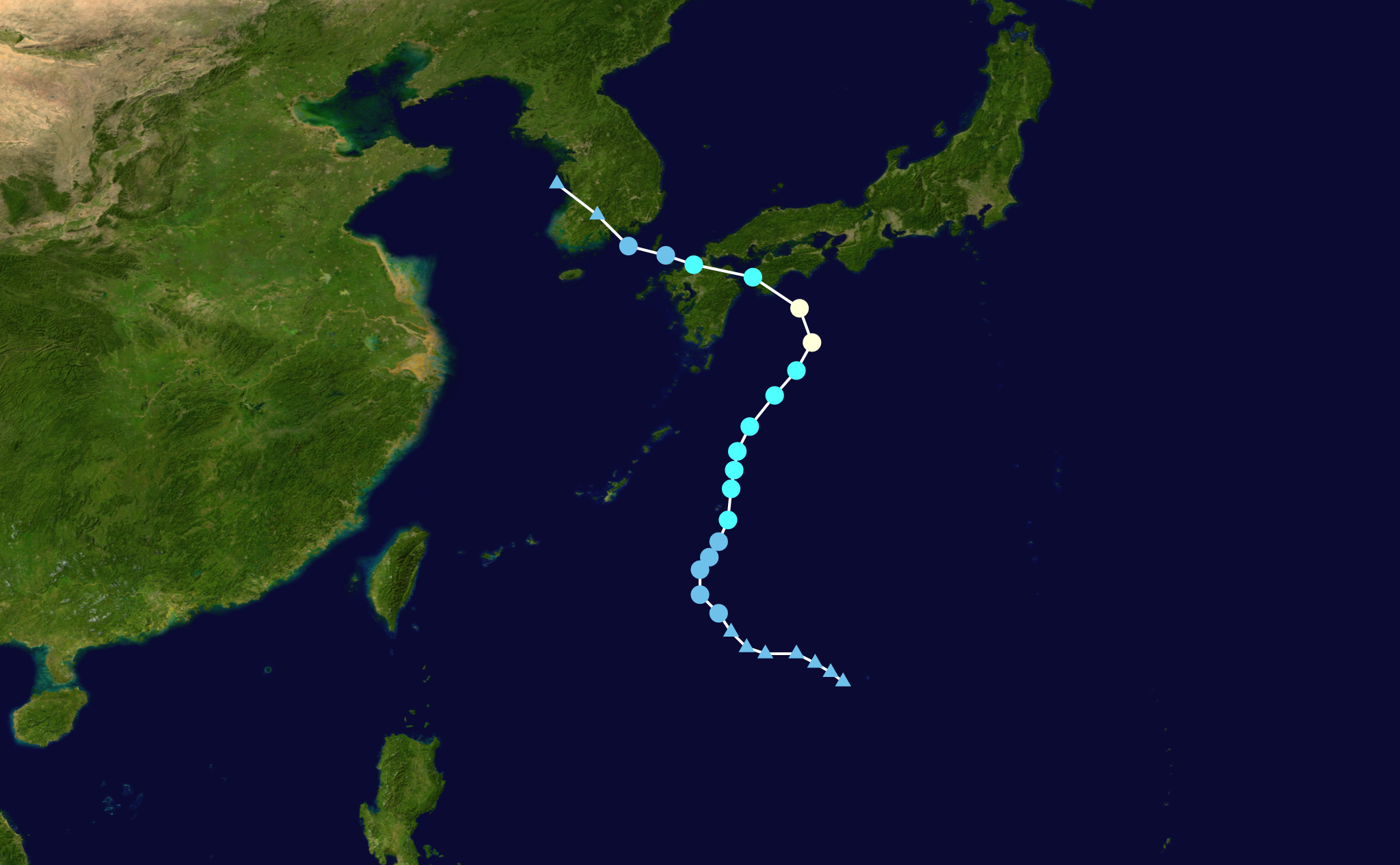
Map plotting the storm's track and intensity, according to the Saffir–Simpson scale Map key Saffir–Simpson scale Tropical depression (≤38 mph, ≤62 km/h) Tropical storm (39–73 mph, 63–118 km/h) Category 1 (74–95 mph, 119–153 km/h) Category 2 (96–110 mph, 154–177 km/h) Category 3 (111–129 mph, 178–208 km/h) Category 4 (130–156 mph, 209–251 km/h) Category 5 (≥157 mph, ≥252 km/h) Unknown Storm type Tropical cyclone Subtropical cyclone Extratropical cyclone, remnant low, tropical disturbance, or monsoon depression

The final tropical cyclone to develop during July 1992, Tropical Storm Irving originated from a distinct but weak low-pressure area embedded in the Western Pacific monsoon trough that extended from the South China Sea to the central Philippine Sea. The Joint Typhoon Warning Center (JTWC) starting following the system at 06:00 UTC on July 30. Thunderstorm activity steadily increased; however, multiple low-level circulations remained present. On July 31, the Japan Meteorological Agency (JMA) upgraded the system into a tropical depression. (Note: The Japan Meteorological Agency is the official Regional Specialized Meteorological Center for the western Pacific Ocean.) (Note: Wind estimates from the JMA and most other basins throughout the world are sustained over 10 minutes, while estimates from the United States-based Joint Typhoon Warning Center are sustained over 1 minute. 10-minute winds are about 1.14 times the amount of 1-minute winds.) The development of curved cloud lines on satellite imagery prompted to the JTWC to issue a Tropical Cyclone Formation Alert at 08:02 UTC. Following an improvement of the system's structure, the JTWC upgraded the system into a tropical depression, and the first warning was issued. A hurricane hunter aircraft investigated the system and discovered that the low-level circulation was 220 km (135 mi) further north than what was inferred from the satellite data. The depression slowly tracked northward near the western periphery of a subtropical ridge. Early on August 2, the JMA classified the depression as a tropical storm. Meanwhile, the JTWC upgraded the depression into Tropical Storm Irving, based on an increase in atmospheric convection near the center and Dvorak satellite estimates.

After tracking north-northeast, Irving then turned northeast. On the morning of August 3, the JMA upgraded Irving into a severe tropical storm. According to the JTWC, the cyclone attained typhoon intensity that evening. At the same time, the JMA estimated that Irving attained its peak intensity of 105 km/h (65 mph) and a barometric pressure of 980 mbar (28.94 inHg). According to the JTWC, Irving continued to intensify in contrast to forecasts and attained a peak intensity of 145 km/h (90 mph) at 00:00 UTC on August 4, in agreement with surface observations. However, this period of intensification was not observed during real time by the JTWC; operationally, the organization estimated maximum winds of 105 km/h (65 mph), based on Dvorak intensity estimates. At the time of peak intensity, visible satellite imagery showed an elliptic eye 185 km (115 mi) in diameter. With a subtropical ridge established to the north, the tropical cyclone began to track west-northwestward. Upon making landfall over southwestern Shikoku at peak intensity, Irving turned sharply to the west and rapidly weakened. The JTWC and JMA downgraded Irving to a tropical storm on August 4 as it interacted with land. After weakening to a tropical depression later that day, Irving dissipated over the Korea Strait near Pusan. The JMA ceased watching the remnants of the system midday on August 5.

== Impact ==
Tropical Storm Irving was the first of two successive systems to move over the Japanese archipelago, with Typhoon Jannis succeeding it. The storm dropped heavy rainfall across much of the Japanese archipelago. A peak rainfall total of 519 mm (20.4 in) occurred at Nagaoka District. During a 24-hour time period, 338 mm (13.3 in) fell in Hidegadake. A peak hourly rainfall total of 68 mm (2.7 in) was observed in Odochi. A wind gust of 151 km/h (94 mph) was recorded in Tosashimizu.

Across Tokushima Prefecture, there were four landslides and roads were cut in two places. Two people suffered injuries in Kōchi Prefecture. Damage was estimated at ¥514 million, of which ¥447 million was due to 2,055 ha (5,080 acres) of crop damage. Roads were cut in 89 spots and 1,180 customers lost power for half an hour. Strong winds also downed many trees and all transport in the prefecture was halted. Irving passed quite close to Oita Prefecture; however, the storm's small size limited damage. Twenty-five flights were cancelled at Fukuoka Airport and two more were cancelled at Kitakyushu Airport. Ten ferries were cancelled in Fukuoka Prefecture. Roads were damaged in 17 spots in Wakayama prefecture, where two people were reported missing due to rough seas. Two Okayama Airport flights were cancelled. A swimmer was reported missing and two other individuals were killed offshore Kyōtango due to high waves. A total of 42 ha (100 acres) of crops were damaged in Kyoto Prefecture, amounting to ¥87 million. Overall, 51 flights linking Osaka and Shikoku were cancelled and ferry services between the Kansai region and Shikoku were also suspended. Damage was estimated at ¥601 million.

== See also ==
- Tropical Storm Harry (1991) - similar early-season tropical cyclone that struck Japan
