= Typhoon Ellie =

Pacific typhoon in 1994

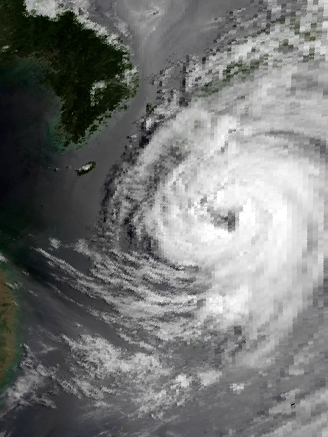
- Ellie near peak intensity on August 6

Meteorological history
- Formed: August 6, 1994
- Extratropical: August 16, 1994
- Dissipated: August 19, 1994

Typhoon
- 10-minute sustained (JMA)
- Highest winds: 130 km/h (80 mph)
- Lowest pressure: 965 hPa (mbar); 28.50 inHg

Category 1-equivalent typhoon
- 1-minute sustained (SSHWS/JTWC)
- Highest winds: 150 km/h (90 mph)
- Lowest pressure: 963 hPa (mbar); 28.44 inHg

Overall effects
- Fatalities: 1 total
- Damage: $41.7 million (1994 USD)
- Areas affected: Japan; China; North Korea; Russia
- Part of the 1994 Pacific typhoon season

Typhoon Ellie was a moderately strong typhoon which affected portions of the Far East during August 1994. The fourteenth storm and fifth typhoon of the 1994 Pacific typhoon season, Ellie originated from an area of convection located at the base of a mid-latitude trough. Drifting slowly southwards, the disturbance transitioned into a tropical depression on August 6. It continued to develop and peaked as a typhoon on August 12. As it weakened, Ellie made landfall twice in China on August 14 and 16, and transitioned into an extratropical cyclone soon after. As Ellie tracked further inland, it was last monitored on August 19.

In preparation for the typhoon, many warnings and watches were issued in Japan, and some high-speed ferry services were cancelled. As Ellie neared Japan, a man drowned in Izu Ōshima when he was swept away by a high wave. Elsewhere, in Kagoshima Prefecture, a breakwater in Kumage district suffered some damage while heavy rainfall caused a dam to fail. In Tokushima prefecture, a mountainside collapsed on a forest road in Naka District. In total, Ellie caused around 5.692 billion yen (USD$41.653 million) in damage.

== Meteorological history ==
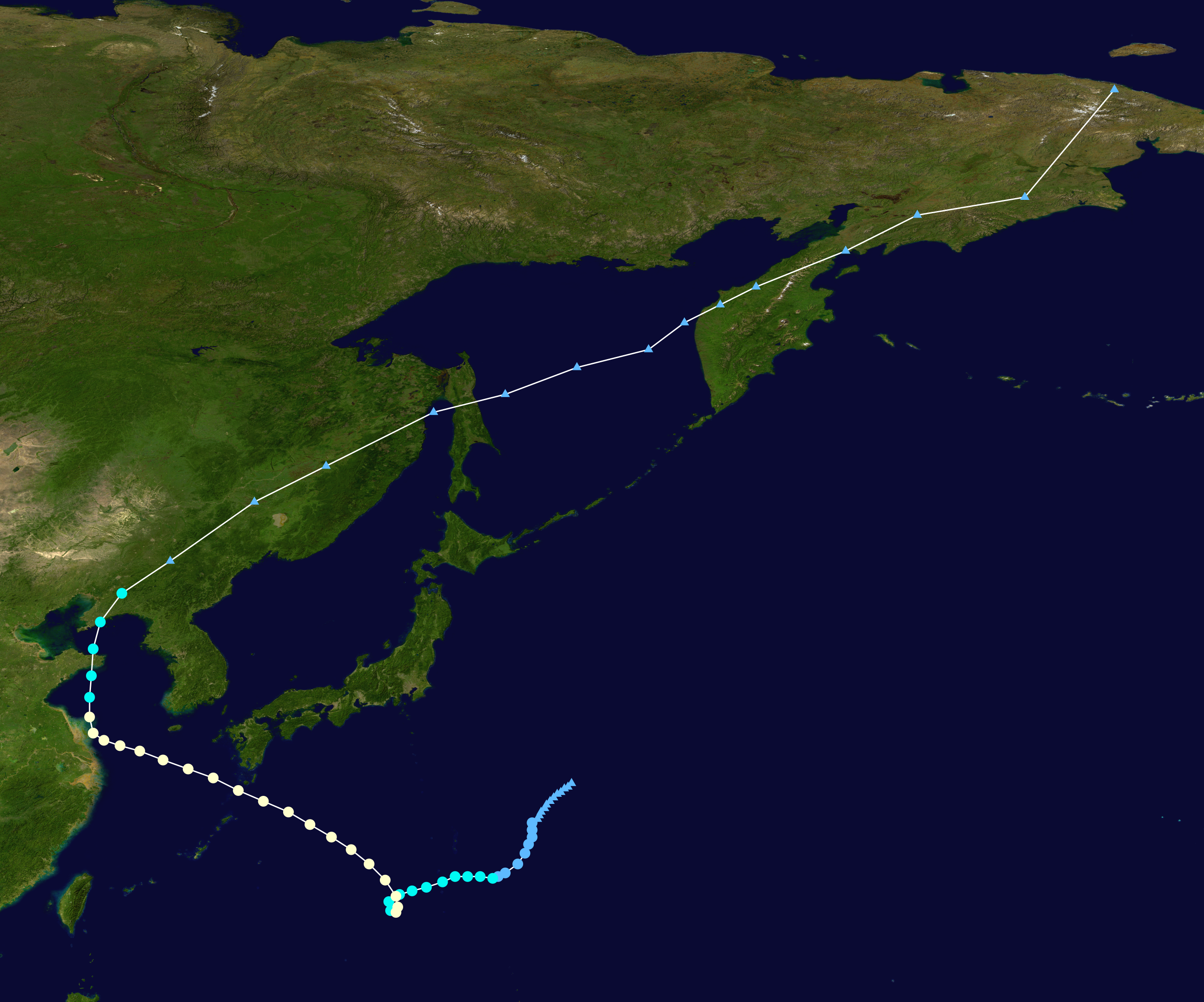
Map plotting the storm's track and intensity, according to the Saffir–Simpson scale Map key Saffir–Simpson scale Tropical depression (≤38 mph, ≤62 km/h) Tropical storm (39–73 mph, 63–118 km/h) Category 1 (74–95 mph, 119–153 km/h) Category 2 (96–110 mph, 154–177 km/h) Category 3 (111–129 mph, 178–208 km/h) Category 4 (130–156 mph, 209–251 km/h) Category 5 (≥157 mph, ≥252 km/h) Unknown Storm type Tropical cyclone Subtropical cyclone Extratropical cyclone, remnant low, tropical disturbance, or monsoon depression

The disturbance that became Typhoon Ellie originated from an area of deep convection located in the subtropics at the base of a weak mid-latitude trough. Drifting slowly southwards, the disturbance was first noted by the Joint Typhoon Warning Center (JTWC) early on August 3. Throughout the next several days, the extent of the tropical disturbance's deep convection increased as its low-level circulation became increasingly well defined, prompting the Japan Meteorological Agency, the Regional Specialized Meteorological Centre of the Western Pacific, to note that it had transitioned into a tropical depression on August 6, with the JTWC following suit two days later. After it developed into a tropical storm at 06:00 UTC that day, the JTWC named the system Tropical Storm Ellie a few hours later.

As Ellie steadily developed, deep convection near its center gradually led to the development of a large 60 nautical miles (110 km) relatively cloud-free center, however, as satellite analysis revealed that significant breaks in the deep convection were evident, it was not classified as an eye at that time. Ellie developed into a severe tropical storm late on August 9, and a large ragged eye developed. After temporarily stalling the next day, Ellie began tracking west-northwestward at a steady 15 mph (24 km/h) throughout the next few days. Ellie developed into a typhoon on August 12, and peaked with 1-minute sustained winds of 80 kn (90 mph) and 10-minute sustained winds of 70 kn (80 mph) later that day.

On August 14, Ellie begin tracking northwards, steadily weakening in the process. A few hours later, Ellie weakened into a severe tropical storm. It made landfall in Wendeng, China around 12:00 UTC the next day with sustained winds of 50 kn (60 mph), weakening into a tropical storm early on August 16. Soon after, Ellie made its second landfall between Dalian, China and the China–North Korea border, transitioning into an extratropical cyclone soon after. As Ellie tracked further inland, the JTWC issued their last warning on the system soon after, with the JMA issuing their last advisories on the remnants of Ellie three days later.

== Preparations ==
In preparation for the typhoon, on August 9, a thunder warning was raised for northern Japan while a lightning and wave advisory was issued for the south. The next day, this was upgraded into a thunder, strong winds, and waves warning. On August 12, the warnings were downgraded into a lightning, strong winds, and waves advisory for the north, with a wave warning issued for the south. By August 15, all warnings and watches were cancelled. In all, 17 high-speed ferry services were cancelled alongside one special flight from Tokyo.

== Impact ==
=== Japan ===
As Ellie neared Japan from August 12–13, the typhoon caused high swells in the Izu Islands, causing a man in Izu Ōshima to be swept away by a high wave and drown. Elsewhere, in Kagoshima Prefecture, a breakwater in Kumage district suffered some damage. In Yamagawa, heavy rainfall caused a dam to fail, while a warehouse collapsed. In Toshima, many telephone cables were cut, causing approximately 90 lines to be out of service. In total, Ellie caused around 5.627 billion yen (USD$41.59 million) in the prefecture, Elsewhere, in Tokushima prefecture, a mountainside collapsed on a forest road in Naka District. In that prefecture, Ellie caused 65 million yen (USD$513 thousand) in damage.

=== Elsewhere ===
In Eastern China, Ellie produced rain showers amounting to 10–70 mm (0.39–2.76 in) across Zhejiang and Jiangsu. Elsewhere, in Manchuria, Ellie's remnants produced 20–130 mm (0.79–5.12 in) of rain, causing some flooding but primarily benefiting the growth of corn and soybeans. Despite not bringing heavy rain to South Korea, Ellie's winds would still affect the nation. Ellie would still produce moderate rainfall, peaking in Seongju County with 50.5 mm (1.99 in) recorded on August 16. The remnants of Ellie affected fifteen settlements in the divisions of Primorsky and Khabarovsk, producing 200 mm (7.9 in) over the area in a few days.
