= Typhoon Zeke =

Pacific typhoon in 1991

Typhoon Zeke (Etang)
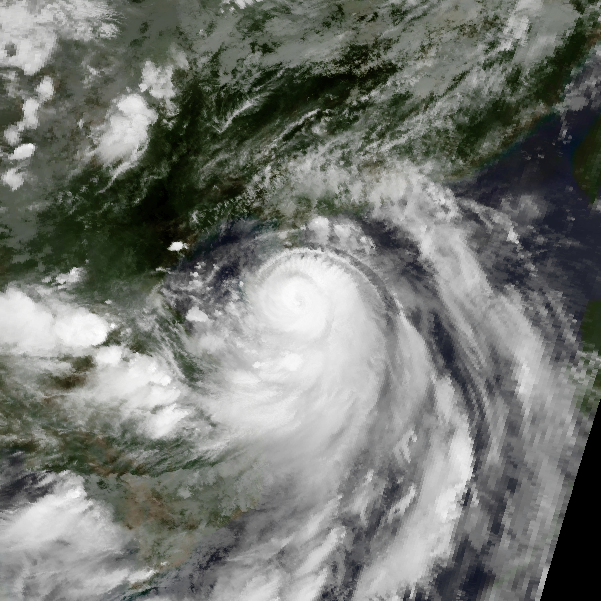
- Typhoon Zeke at peak intensity approaching Hainan on July 12

Meteorological history
- Formed: July 9, 1991
- Dissipated: July 15, 1991

Typhoon
- 10-minute sustained (JMA)
- Highest winds: 120 km/h (75 mph)
- Lowest pressure: 970 hPa (mbar); 28.64 inHg

Category 2-equivalent typhoon
- 1-minute sustained (SSHWS/JTWC)
- Highest winds: 155 km/h (100 mph)
- Lowest pressure: 970 hPa (mbar); 28.64 inHg

Overall effects
- Fatalities: 33
- Missing: 13
- Damage: $960 million (1991 USD)
- Areas affected: Philippines, Hong Kong, southern China
- Part of the 1991 Pacific typhoon season

Typhoon Zeke, known in the Philippines as Typhoon Etang, was the first of two typhoons to make landfall in China within a week during mid-July 1991. An area of disturbed weather developed east of the Philippines towards the end of the first week of July. Tracking west-northwestward, the disturbance organized into a tropical depression on July 9. After tracking across the Philippines, where it left two people missing and injured three others, the depression intensified into a tropical storm on July 10. The storm steadily deepened as it moved across the South China Sea, and on July 12 it strengthened into a typhoon. While at its peak intensity of 120 km/h (75 mph), (Note: All winds are in ten-minute sustained standards unless otherwise implied by the agency the winds were from.) Zeke moved onshore at Hainan, where it began to weaken. The system tracked across Vietnam on July 13, and dissipated within two days after moving inland.

Across Hainan, 30 people were killed and 77 others were injured. Nearly 3,700 homes were destroyed and over 58,000 others were damaged. Around 900,000 ha (2,200,000 acres) of farmland was flooded. Eighty-three ships sunk and thirty-eight bridges collapsed. Overall, damage in the province was estimated at ¥5.1 billion (US$956 million). (Note: Currencies can be converted to United States Dollars using (New People's Currency) Yuan Measuring worth with an exchange rate of the year 1991.) In the province of Guangxi, at least one person was killed and another injured, while over 180 houses were destroyed and 5,000 others damaged. Offshore Fangchenggang, two people died and seven went missing after a ship sunk. Elsewhere, in the province of Guangdong, four people were reported missing and 1,170 homes were destroyed. More than 30,000 ha (74,130 acres) of farmland was destroyed, and overall damage was estimated at ¥19.4 million (US$3.63 million). Nationwide, 33 people were killed and 11 others were listed as missing.

== Meteorological history ==
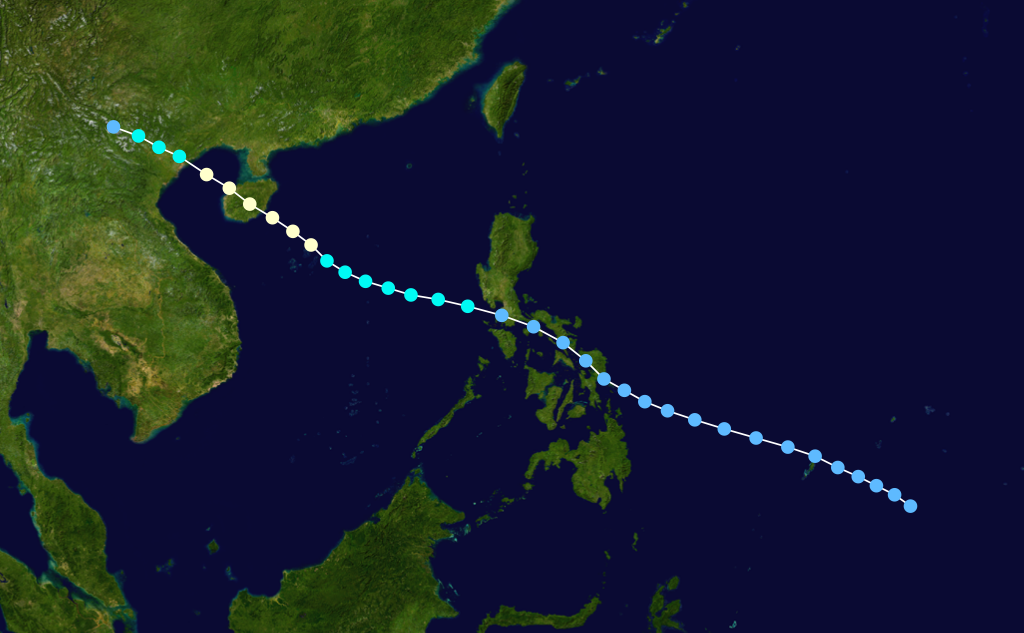
Map plotting the storm's track and intensity, according to the Saffir–Simpson scale Map key Saffir–Simpson scale Tropical depression (≤38 mph, ≤62 km/h) Tropical storm (39–73 mph, 63–118 km/h) Category 1 (74–95 mph, 119–153 km/h) Category 2 (96–110 mph, 154–177 km/h) Category 3 (111–129 mph, 178–208 km/h) Category 4 (130–156 mph, 209–251 km/h) Category 5 (≥157 mph, ≥252 km/h) Unknown Storm type Tropical cyclone Subtropical cyclone Extratropical cyclone, remnant low, tropical disturbance, or monsoon depression

Typhoon Zeke developed from a tropical disturbance in the Western Pacific monsoon trough southwest of Guam. Increased convection associated with the disturbance was first monitored by the Joint Typhoon Warning Center (JTWC) at 06:00 UTC on July 6, 1991. Following evidence that the disturbance had developed a low pressure center, the JTWC issued a Tropical Cyclone Formation Alert early on July 9. Two hours later, the Japan Meteorological Agency (JMA) upgraded the system into a tropical depression. After a steady increase in deep convection near the center of the system, the JTWC declared it a tropical depression at noon on July 9.

Tracking west-northwest at 13 km/h (8.1 mph) under the influence of a subtropical ridge to the north, the depression made landfall 50 km (30 mi) south-southwest of Manila. The depression tracked across the Luzon as it accelerated to the northwest in response to a surge in the southwesterly monsoonal flow over the South China Sea and emerged into the South China Sea on July 10, when it was upgraded into a tropical storm by the JTWC and JMA, with the former naming it Zeke. (Note: The Japan Meteorological Agency is the official Regional Specialized Meteorological Center for the western Pacific Ocean.) (Note: Wind estimates from the JMA and most other basins throughout the world are sustained over 10 minutes, while estimates from the United States-based Joint Typhoon Warning Center are sustained over 1 minute. 10-minute wind speeds are about 1.14 times the amount of 1-minute wind speeds.) Reports from ships in the South China Sea indicated a highly asymmetric wind profile, with the radius of 55 km/h (35 mph) winds extending over 290 mi (465 km) southeast of the center, but less than 115 mi (185 km) to the northwest, making its structure akin to a large monsoon depression. Despite the Navy Global Environmental Model and in turn the JTWC calling for recurvature, Zeke reverted to a largely westward track. On the morning of July 11, Zeke was upgraded into a severe tropical storm by the JMA. Twenty-four hours later, the JTWC declared the cyclone a typhoon. Shortly before Zeke struck Hainan, the JTWC estimated that Zeke attained its peak intensity of 145 km/h (90 mph). Meanwhile, the JMA estimated that Zeke obtained its peak wind speed of 120 km/h (75 mph) and a minimum barometric pressure of 970 mbar (29 inHg). Zeke weakened slightly after crossing the island, with the JMA downgrading the system into a severe tropical storm on the morning of July 13. Later that day, Zeke moved onshore about 50 km (30 mi) northeast of Haiphong in Vietnam. Weakening accelerated as it moved inland, and by midday on July 14, the JTWC had ceased tracking the storm. The JMA followed suit early the next day.

== Impact ==
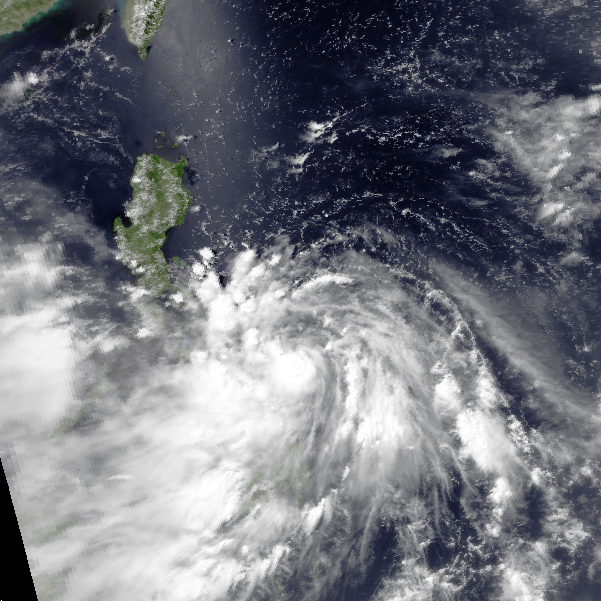
A tropical depression that would become Zeke on July 9 near the Philippines

During its formative stages, the depression left two people reported as missing and injured three people across the Philippines. Zeke was responsible for heavy damage across Hainan, the most southern province in China. Power was knocked out in five counties in the province. According to press reports, 30 people were killed there and 77 others were injured. Close to 3,700 houses collapsed, and 58,103 others were damaged. At least 900,000 ha (2,200,000 acres) of farmland was inundated, and 9.33 million rubber trees and 380 ha (940 acres) of fishery ponds were destroyed. Eighty-three vessels sank. Additionally, the storm destroyed 28,000 head of livestock, 718 km (446 mi) of highways, 38 bridges, and 1,282 km (797 mi) of power lines. Monetary damage in the province was estimated at ¥5.1 billion (US$956 million).

In the province of Guangxi, at least one person was killed and another was injured. There, over 180 houses were destroyed and 5,000 others were damaged. About 20,000 ha (49,420 acres) of paddy field were damaged. Offshore Fangchenggang, two people died, seven were missing, and nineteen survived after a Vietnamese cargo vessel sank. In western Guangdong, where 1,170 houses collapsed and 11,700 others were damaged, four people went missing. More than 30,000 ha (74,130 acres) of farmland was destroyed. Damage was estimated at ¥19.4 million (US$3.63 million). Zeke was the first of two typhoons to hit China in a week, the second being Typhoon Amy.

In Hong Kong, a No. 1 hurricane scale was declared at 00:50 UTC on July 12 when Zeke was about 640 km (400 mi) to the south. As winds across Hong Kong continued to increase and Zeke made its closest approach to the area, a No. 3 signal was issued. The lowest sea-level pressure of 1,003 mbar (29.6 inHg) was recorded at the Hong Kong Royal Observatory just before noon on July 12. A peak of 97 mm (3.8 in) of rainfall was recorded in Tai Mo Shan, where winds of 79 km/h (49 mph) and gusts of 112 km/h (70 mph) were measured. All signals were dropped by the end of the day as the threat subsided.

== See also ==
- Typhoon Hal (1985)
