= List of storms named Erika =

The name Erika, or Erica, has been used for seven tropical cyclones worldwide, five in the Atlantic Ocean and two in the Australian Region.

In the Atlantic:

- Tropical Storm Erika (1991), struck São Miguel and Santa Maria islands in the Azores as an extratropical storm.
- Hurricane Erika (1997), long-lived Category 3 hurricane that approached the Lesser Antilles before curving northward and moving into the open ocean.
- Hurricane Erika (2003), weak Category 1 hurricane that made landfall in northeastern Mexico, near the Texas-Tamaulipas border.
- Tropical Storm Erika (2009), made landfall on Guadeloupe, and dissipated southeast of Puerto Rico the following day.
- Tropical Storm Erika (2015), made landfall on Dominica; caused US$500 million in damage and 31 fatalities.

The name Erika was retired after the 2015 season, and was replaced by Elsa for the 2021 season.

In the Australian Region:

- Cyclone Erica (1973) – brought heavy rainfall to portions of Western Australia.
- Cyclone Erica (2003) – a powerful cyclone that severely affected New Caledonia.

The name Erica was retired after the 2003 season.
