= List of storms named Eseta =

The name Eseta has been used for two tropical cyclones in the South Pacific region of the Southern Hemisphere:

- Cyclone Eseta (1988) – a strong tropical cyclone that caused heavy rainfall within Vanuatu, Fiji, and New Caledonia. However there were no reports of any damages to property or crops.
- Cyclone Eseta (2003) – a Category 4 tropical cyclone that was well offshore of any islands in the Pacific, rains and wind caused some damage.
