= Cyclone Vance =

Category 5 Australian region cyclone in 1999

Severe Tropical Cyclone Vance
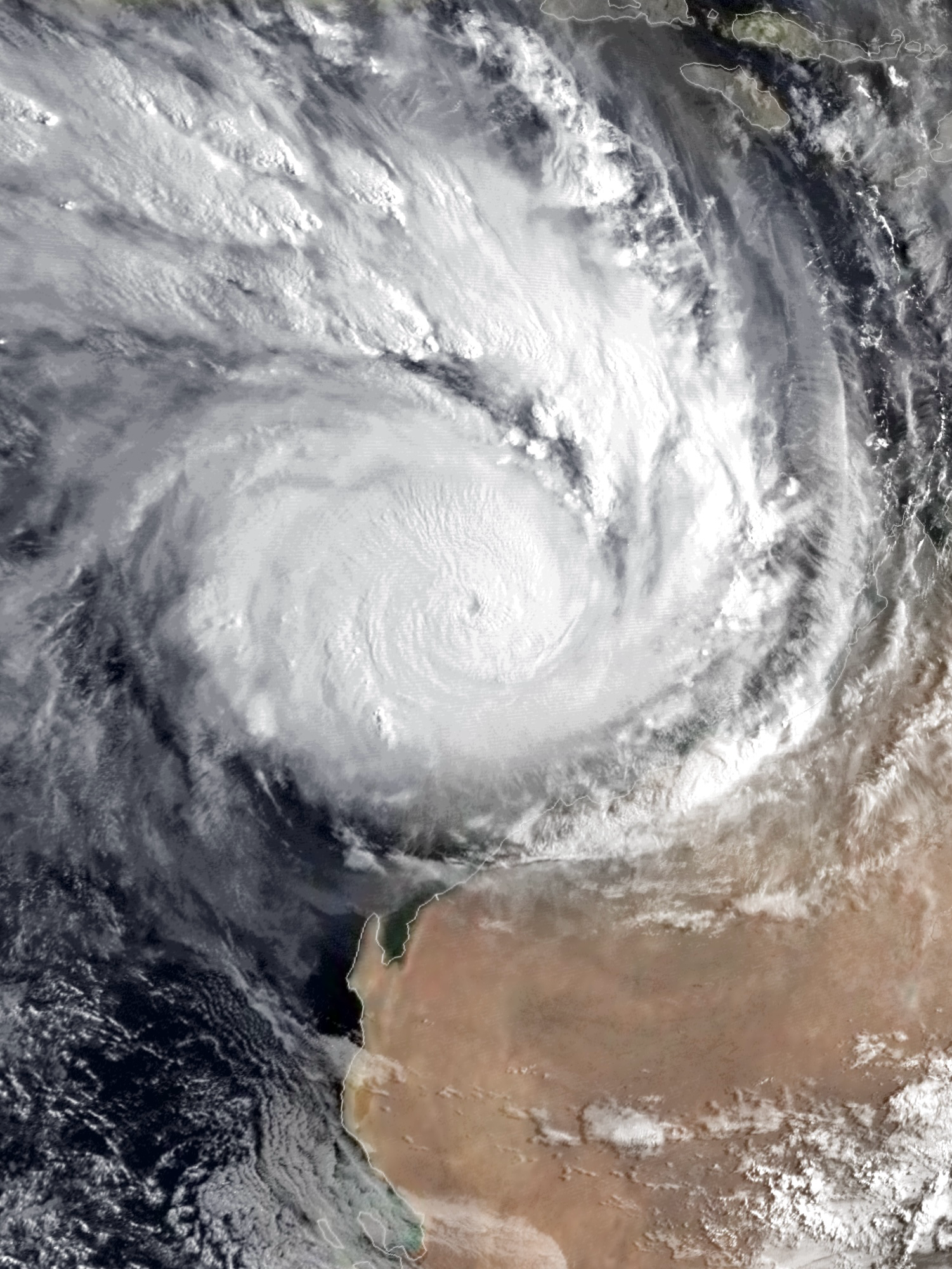
- Vance nearing Western Australia shortly after its peak intensity on 20 March

Meteorological history
- Formed: 16 March 1999
- Extratropical: 23 March 1999
- Dissipated: 23 March 1999

Category 5 severe tropical cyclone
- 10-minute sustained (BOM)
- Highest winds: 220 km/h (140 mph)
- Lowest pressure: 910 hPa (mbar); 26.87 inHg

Category 4-equivalent tropical cyclone
- 1-minute sustained (SSHWS/JTWC)
- Highest winds: 230 km/h (145 mph)
- Lowest pressure: 916 hPa (mbar); 27.05 inHg

Overall effects
- Fatalities: None
- Damage: $100 million (1999 USD)
- Areas affected: Northern Territory; Western Australia; South Australia; Victoria; Tasmania
- IBTrACS
- Part of the 1998–99 Australian region cyclone season

Severe Tropical Cyclone Vance was a tropical cyclone that struck Western Australia during the active 1998–99 Australian region cyclone season, and was also one of six tropical cyclones to form off the coast of Australia during that season. When making landfall the Learmonth Meteorological Office (35 km south of Exmouth) recorded the highest Australian wind gust of 267 km/h (166 mph). The previous highest gust was 259 km/h (161 mph) at nearby Mardie during Cyclone Trixie. This record was surpassed in 2010 after a world record wind-gust of 408 km/h (254 mph) at Barrow Island during Cyclone Olivia in 1996 was declared official by the World Meteorological Organisation.

Forming on 19 March 1999, in the Timor Sea, Vance then curved west-southwest where it recurved and struck the Gascoyne and Pilbara coasts of Western Australia on 22 March as a Category 5 cyclone on the Australian scale and dissipating the following day.

Vance caused severe damage across the western coast of Australia. The hardest hit town was Exmouth where 70 percent of the buildings sustained severe damage. However, because of advance warnings there were no reports of fatalities. Damage totaled AU 100,000,000 (1999 USD).

== Meteorological history ==
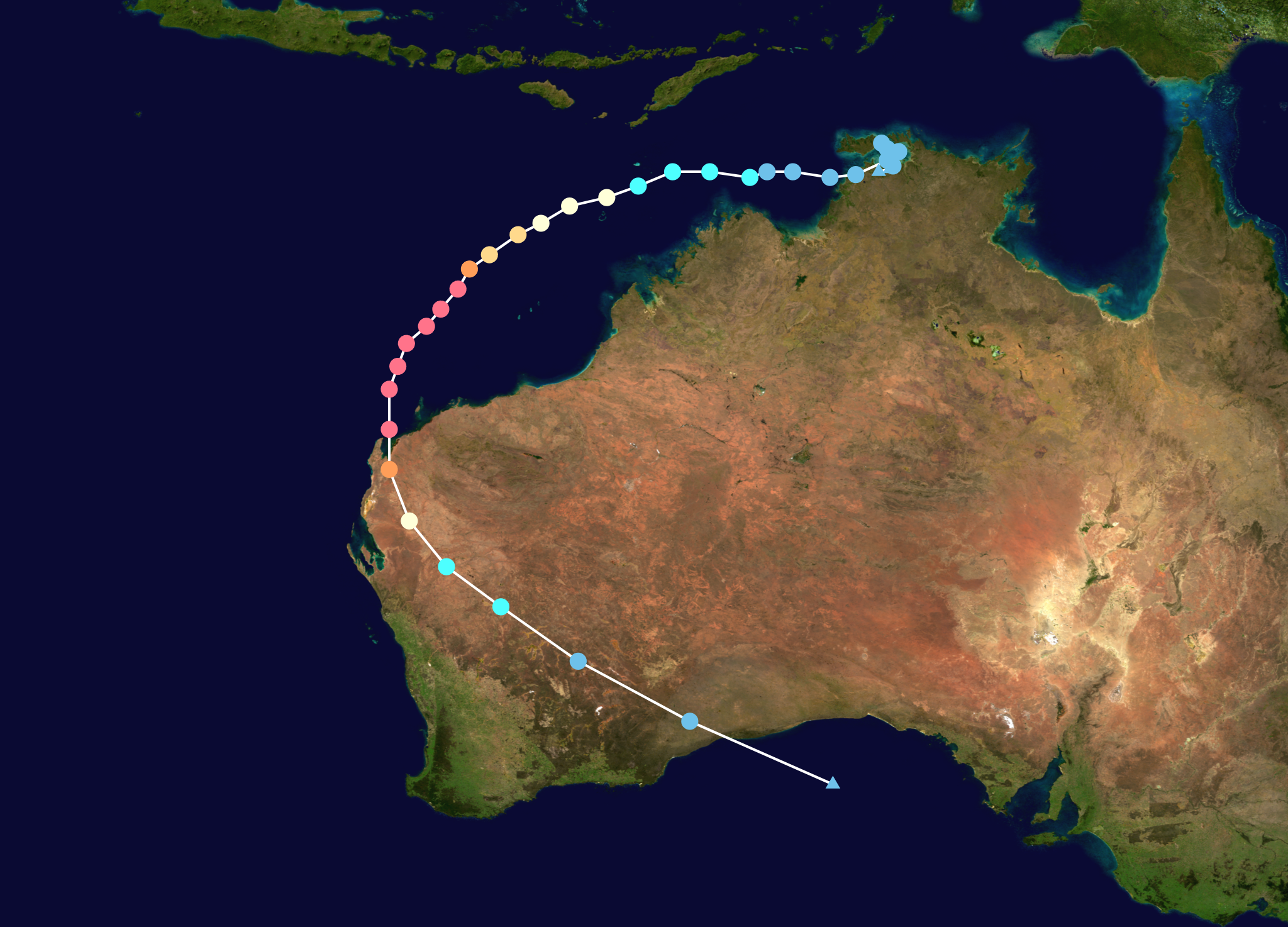
Map plotting the storm's track and intensity, according to the Saffir–Simpson scale Map key Saffir–Simpson scale Tropical depression (≤38 mph, ≤62 km/h) Tropical storm (39–73 mph, 63–118 km/h) Category 1 (74–95 mph, 119–153 km/h) Category 2 (96–110 mph, 154–177 km/h) Category 3 (111–129 mph, 178–208 km/h) Category 4 (130–156 mph, 209–251 km/h) Category 5 (≥157 mph, ≥252 km/h) Unknown Storm type Tropical cyclone Subtropical cyclone Extratropical cyclone, remnant low, tropical disturbance, or monsoon depression

An area of low pressure formed on 16 March, six hundred miles northwest of Darwin, Australia. The storm then quickly reached tropical depression strength as it curved over the Northern Territory causing no damage. On 18 March, the tropical depression intensified and became Tropical Storm Vance 523 km (325 mi) west of Darwin.

Interacting with a subtropical ridge, the storm moved westward and then southwestward where it reached Category 1 cyclone status on the 19th. The cyclone then continued southwestward, strengthening to a Category 5 storm overnight on 20 March with gusts of more than 280 km/h (170 mph) winds. Vance reached a pressure of 910 millibars (hPa) before curving to the south, heading towards the Exmouth Gulf.

Vance then made landfall near Exmouth on 22 March as a strong Category 4 cyclone. Moving inland, the cyclone then turned a more south-southeasterly direction as before weakening to tropical storm status. Vance then became extratropical the next day, with its extratropical remnants producing gale force winds that affected South Australia, Victoria and Tasmania.

== Preparations ==
Hundreds of people evacuated and authorities closed several roads. In addition, forecasters issued a red alert for the towns of Karratha, Onslow and Exmouth as the cyclone was predicted to bring strong damaging winds to that area while the areas south of the red alert warning area were put under a yellow alert or tropical storm warning. On the 22nd, forecasters predicted that Vance would make landfall between Onslow and Exmouth.

== Impact ==
Most intense Australian cyclones
Rank	Cyclone	Year	Min. pressure
1	Gwenda	1999	900 hPa (26.58 inHg)
1	Inigo	2003	900 hPa (26.58 inHg)
3	George	2007	902 hPa (26.64 inHg)
4	Orson	1989	904 hPa (26.70 inHg)
5	Marcus	2018	905 hPa (26.72 inHg)
6	Theodore	1994	910 hPa (26.87 inHg)
6	Vance	1999	910 hPa (26.87 inHg)
6	Fay	2004	910 hPa (26.87 inHg)
6	Glenda	2006	910 hPa (26.87 inHg)
10	Mahina	1899	914 hPa (26.99 inHg) (Note: Currently, the World Meteorological Organization recognises the lowest pressure of Cyclone Mahina as 27 inches of mercury (914 hPa) based on an observation from the time. A 2014 reconstruction project of Cyclone Mahina by the American Meteorological Society concluded that the 13 metre storm surge produced by the cyclone likely produced barometric pressure levels as low as 880 hPa, which would place it as the strongest tropical cyclone in the Southern Hemisphere, but the metric is not yet approved by the WMO.)
Source: Australian Bureau of Meteorology

The Learmonth Meteorological Office recorded a record gust of 267 km/h (166 mph) and a pressure of 937 millibars. At Onslow, a weather station reported winds gusting to 182 km/h (113 mph) and a barometric pressure of 978 millibars. A storm surge of 3.6 metres (12 feet) was reported in Exmouth. The surge caused severe beach erosion and sunk or damaged several barges. Wind damage in Exmouth was severe, as the storm destroyed over 110 homes and damaged over 220 others. In Onslow, the storm surge flooded several houses. Vance dropped 100–150 mm (3.9–5.9 in) of rain over Western Australia. Some areas in the storm's impact reported rainfall totals of 200–300 mm (7.9–11.8 in). The heavy rain brought by Vance caused severe flash-flooding that knocked out power and communications. Elsewhere, floodwaters washed out several roads and affected areas already impacted by Cyclone Elaine days earlier. The remnants of Vance produced gale-force winds that caused a dust storm that struck Adelaide for several hours with visibility down to a few meters, and knocked down powerlines in Melbourne, leaving 50,000 people without power.
