= List of storms named Elsa =

The name Elsa has been used for one tropical cyclone in the Atlantic Ocean, one in the South Pacific Ocean, and one in the South-West Indian Ocean. The name has also been used for one European windstorm.

In the Atlantic:

- Hurricane Elsa (2021) – a Category 1 hurricane that became the earliest fifth named storm on record in the Atlantic, and affected parts of the Caribbean, the East Coast of the United States and Atlantic Canada.

In the South Pacific:

- Cyclone Elsa (1976) – a Category 2 tropical cyclone.

In the South-West Indian:

- Tropical Depression Elsa (1975) – Affected parts of Southeastern Africa.

In Europe:

- Storm Elsa (2019) – caused eight fatalities, over 140,000 power outages, and other impacts in various European countries.
