= Timeline of the 2013 Pacific hurricane season =

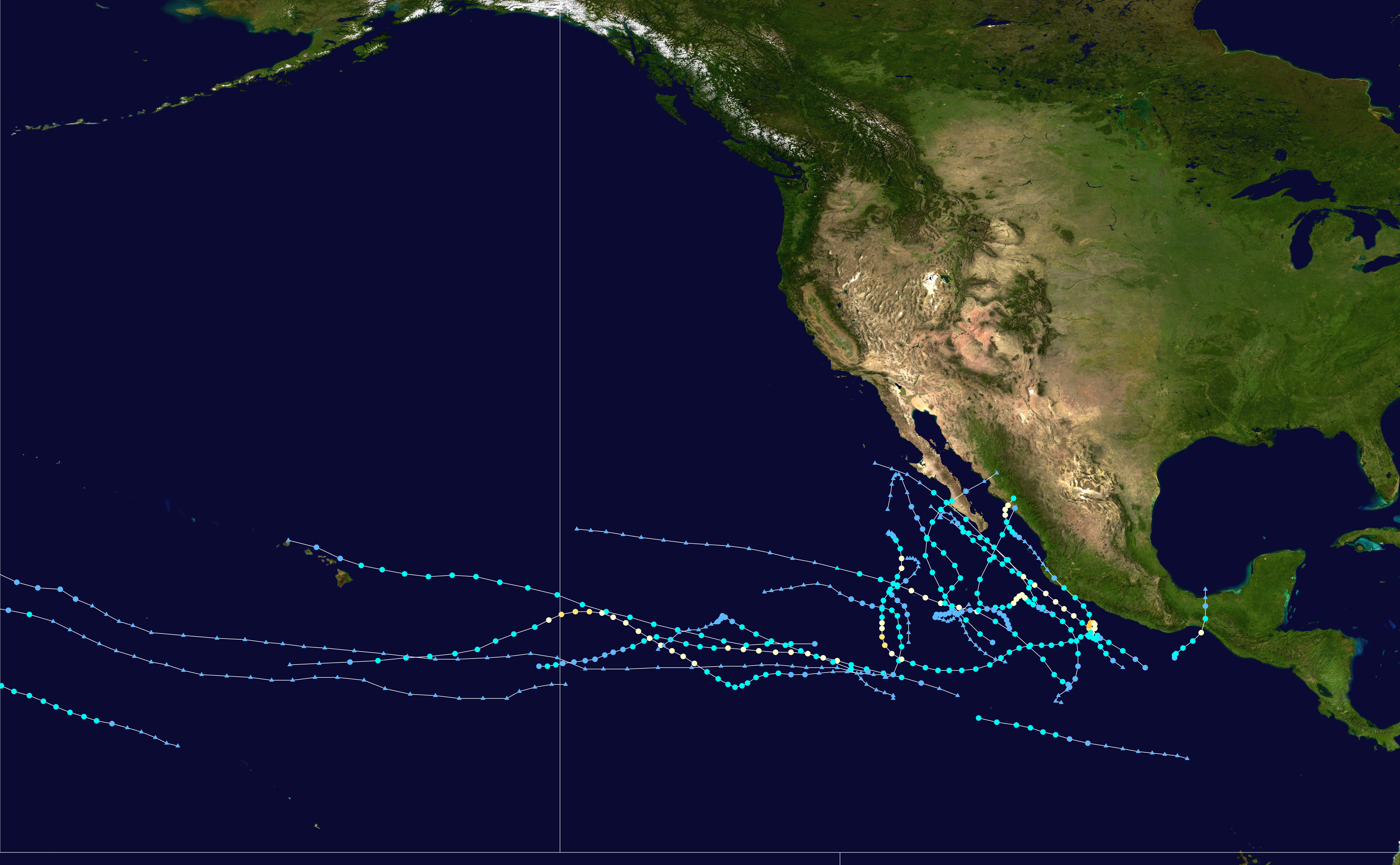
- Season summary map

Season boundaries
- First system formed: May 15, 2013
- Last system dissipated: November 4, 2013

Strongest system
- Name: Raymond
- Maximum winds: 135 mph (220 km/h) (1-minute sustained)
- Lowest pressure: 951 mbar (hPa; 28.08 inHg)

Longest lasting system
- Name: Raymond
- Duration: 10.5 days
Storm articles
- Hurricane Barbara (2013)
- Hurricane Cosme (2013)
- Hurricane Erick (2013)
- Tropical Storm Flossie (2013)
- Hurricane Manuel
- Hurricane Raymond (2013)
- Tropical Storm Sonia (2013)

The 2013 Pacific hurricane season was an above-average year in which twenty named storms developed. (Note: An average season, as defined by the National Oceanic and Atmospheric Administration, has fifteen tropical storms, eight hurricanes and three major hurricanes.) The hurricane season officially began on May 15 in the East Pacific, coinciding with the formation of Tropical Storm Alvin, and on June 1 in the Central Pacific; it ended on November 30 in both basins. (Note: The East Pacific is defined as the region east of 140°W, while the Central Pacific is defined as the region west of 140°W to the International Date Line.) These dates conventionally delimit the period during each year when most tropical cyclones form. The final system of the year, Tropical Storm Sonia, dissipated on November 4.

The season produced twenty-one tropical depressions. All but one further intensified into tropical storms and nine further intensified to become hurricanes. Despite this level of activity, only one hurricane, Raymond, strengthened into a major hurricane. (Note: A major hurricane is a storm that ranks as Category 3 or higher on the Saffir–Simpson hurricane wind scale.) During the season, five named storms made landfall in Mexico: hurricanes Barbara and Manuel, along with tropical storms Juliette, Octave, and Sonia.

This timeline documents tropical cyclone formations, strengthening, weakening, landfalls, extratropical transitions, and dissipations during the season. It includes information that was not released throughout the season, meaning that data from post-storm reviews by the National Hurricane Center and the Central Pacific Hurricane Center, such as a storm that was not initially warned upon, has been included.

The time stamp for each event is first stated using Coordinated Universal Time (UTC), the 24-hour clock where 00:00 = midnight UTC. The NHC uses both UTC and the time zone where the center of the tropical cyclone is currently located. Prior to 2015, two time zones were utilized in the Eastern Pacific basin: Pacific east of 140°W, and Hawaii−Aleutian from 140°W to the International Date Line. In this timeline, the respective area time is included in parentheses. Additionally, figures for maximum sustained winds and position estimates are rounded to the nearest 5 units (miles, or kilometers), following National Hurricane Center practice. Direct wind observations are rounded to the nearest whole number. Atmospheric pressures are listed to the nearest millibar and nearest hundredth of an inch of mercury.

== Timeline ==
=== May ===
May 15

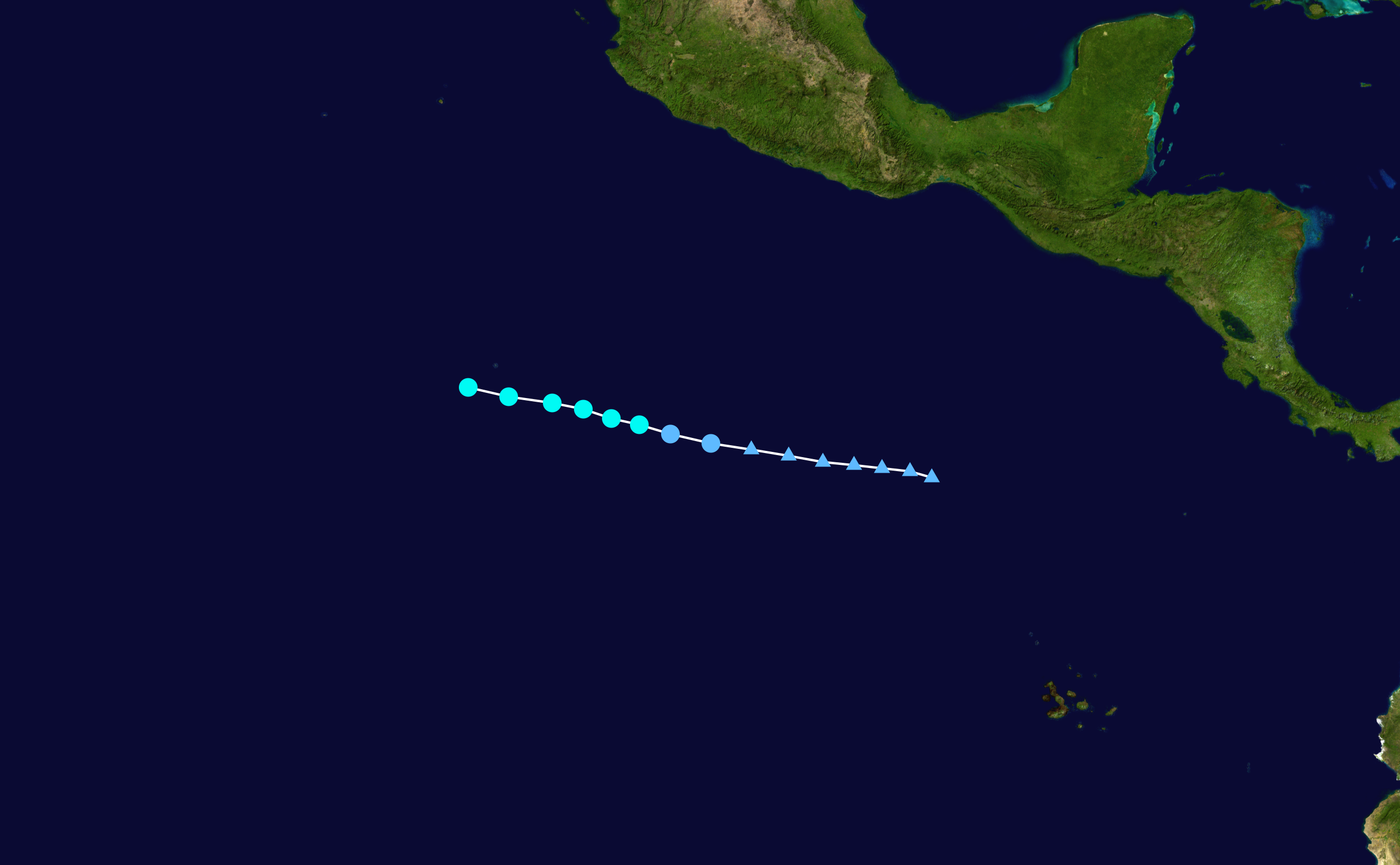
Storm path of Tropical Storm Alvin

- The 2013 East Pacific hurricane season officially begins.
- 0600 UTC (11:00 p.m. PDT May 14) – Tropical Depression One-E develops from an area of low pressure about 650 mi (1,045 km) (Note: The figures for maximum sustained winds and position estimates are rounded to the nearest 5 units (knots, miles, or kilometers), following the convention used in the National Hurricane Center's operational products for each storm. All other units are rounded to the nearest digit.) south-southwest of Acapulco, Mexico, becoming the second lowest-latitude-forming tropical cyclone on record.
- 1800 UTC (11:00 a.m. PDT) – Tropical Depression One-E intensifies into Tropical Storm Alvin roughly 665 mi (1,070 km) south-southwest of Acapulco, Mexico.

May 16

- 0600 UTC (11:00 p.m. PDT May 15) – Tropical Storm Alvin attains its peak intensity with maximum sustained winds of 60 mph (95 km/h) and a minimum barometric pressure of 1000 mb (hPa; 29.53 inHg) about 705 mi (1,135 km) southwest of Acapulco, Mexico.

May 17

- 0600 UTC (11:00 p.m. PDT May 16) – Tropical Storm Alvin dissipates roughly 775 mi (1,245 km) southwest of Manzanillo, Mexico.

May 28

- 1200 UTC (5:00 a.m. PDT) – Tropical Depression Two-E develops from an area of low pressure about 125 mi (200 km) south-southeast of Puerto Ángel, Mexico.
- 1800 UTC (11:00 a.m. PDT) – Tropical Depression Two-E intensifies into Tropical Storm Barbara roughly 110 mi (175 km) south-southeast of Puerto Ángel, Mexico.

May 29

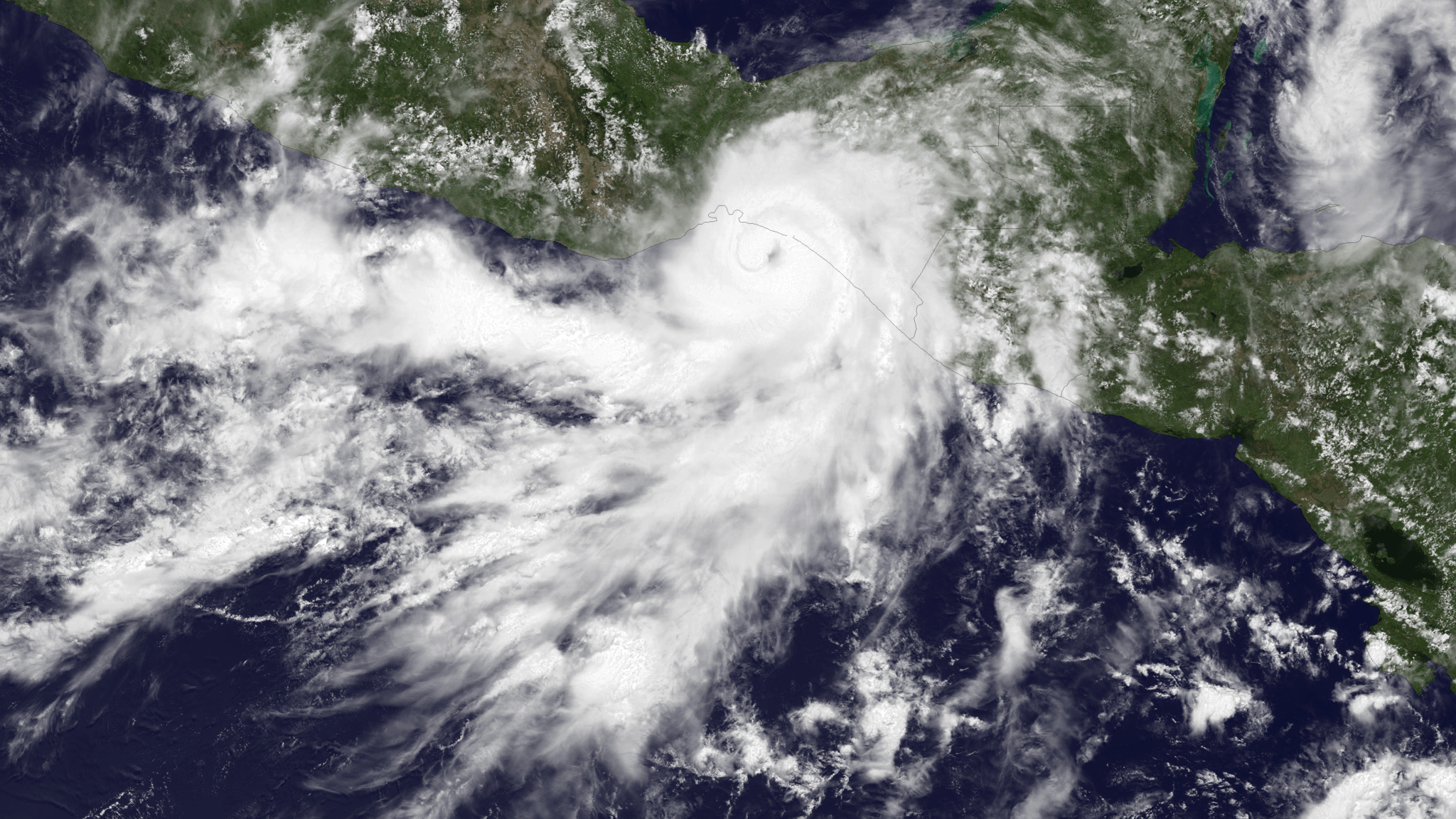
Hurricane Barbara near landfall on May 29

- 1200 UTC (5:00 a.m. PDT) – Tropical Storm Barbara intensifies into a Category 1 hurricane about 75 mi (120 km) southeast of Salina Cruz, Mexico.
- 1950 UTC (12:50 p.m. PDT) – Hurricane Barbara attains its peak intensity with maximum sustained winds of 80 mph (130 km/h) and a minimum barometric pressure of 983 mb (hPa; 29.03 inHg) and simultaneously makes landfall roughly 15 mi (25 km) west-southwest of Tonalá, Mexico, becoming the easternmost landfalling Pacific hurricane on record.

May 30

- 0000 UTC (5:00 p.m. PDT May 29) – Hurricane Barbara weakens to a tropical storm about 10 mi (15 km) east of Cintalapa.
- 0600 UTC (11:00 p.m. PDT May 29) – Tropical Storm Barbara weakens to a tropical depression roughly 70 mi (115 km) southwest of Villahermosa, Mexico.
- 1200 UTC (5:00 a.m. PDT) – Tropical Depression Barbara degenerates into a non-convective remnant area of low pressure about 35 mi (55 km) east-northeast of Coatzacoalcos, Mexico.

=== June ===
June 1

- The 2013 Central Pacific hurricane season officially begins.

June 23

- 1200 UTC (5:00 a.m. PDT) – Tropical Depression Three-E develops from an area of low pressure about 500 mi (805 km) south of Manzanillo, Mexico.

June 24

- 0000 UTC (5:00 p.m. PDT June 23) – Tropical Depression Three-E intensifies into Tropical Storm Cosme roughly 410 mi (660 km) south-southwest of Zihuatanejo, Mexico.

June 25

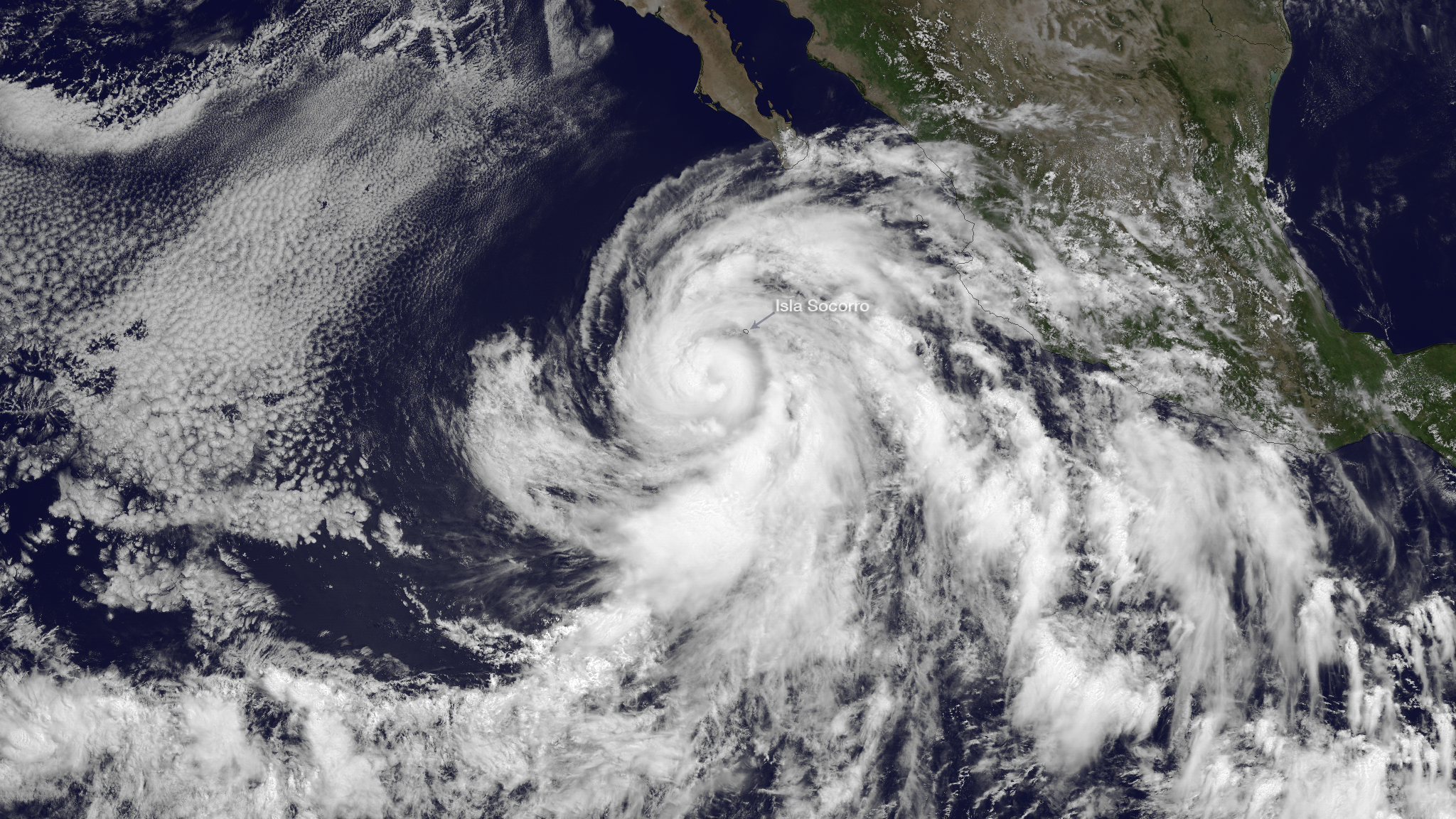
Cosme as a Category 1 hurricane on June 25

- 1200 UTC (5:00 a.m. PDT) – Tropical Storm Cosme intensifies into a Category 1 hurricane about 410 mi (660 km) southwest of Manzanillo, Mexico.

June 26

- 0000 UTC (5:00 p.m. PDT June 25) – Hurricane Cosme attains its peak intensity with maximum sustained winds of 85 mph (135 km/h) and a minimum barometric pressure of 980 mb (hPa; 28.94 inHg).
- 1800 UTC (11:00 a.m. PDT) – Hurricane Cosme weakens to a tropical storm roughly 465 mi (750 mi) southwest of the southern tip of Baja California.

June 27

- 1200 UTC (5:00 a.m. PDT) – Tropical Storm Cosme degenerates into a non-convective remnant area of low pressure about 690 mi (1,110 km) west-southwest of Cabo San Lucas, Mexico.

June 29

- 1800 UTC (11:00 a.m. PDT) – Tropical Depression Four-E develops from an area of low pressure roughly 480 mi (770 km) south of Manzanillo, Mexico.

June 30

- 0600 UTC (11:00 p.m. PDT June 29) – Tropical Depression Four-E intensifies into Tropical Storm Dalila about 280 mi (450 km) southwest of Acapulco, Mexico.

=== July ===
July 2

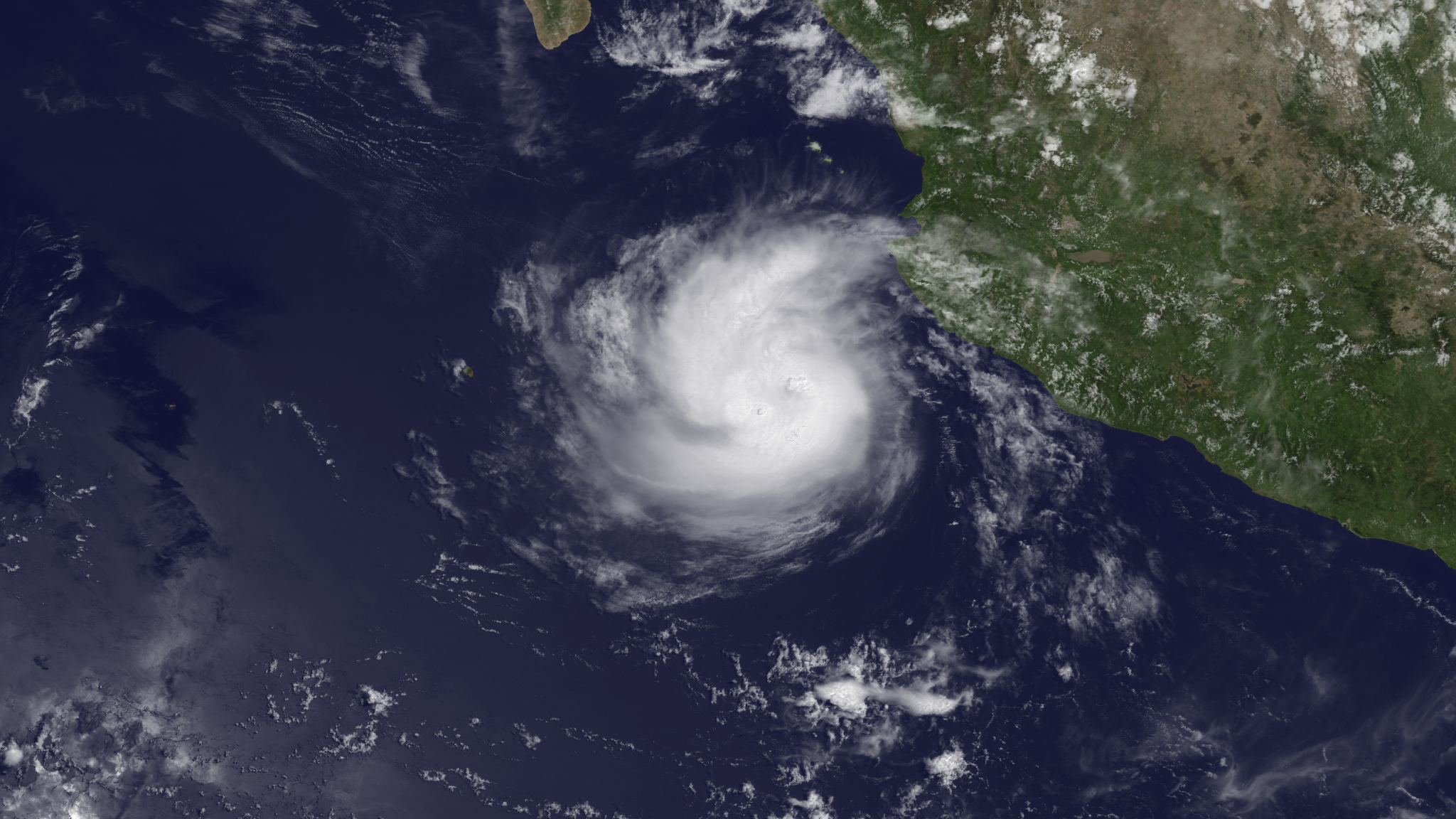
Hurricane Dalila at peak intensity on July 2

- 1200 UTC (5:00 a.m. PDT) – Tropical Storm Dalila intensifies into a Category 1 hurricane roughly 165 mi (265 km) south-southwest of Cabo Corrientes, Mexico.
- 1800 UTC (11:00 a.m. PDT) – Hurricane Dalila attains its peak intensity with maximum sustained winds of 80 mph (130 km/h) and a minimum barometric pressure of 984 mb (hPa; 29.06 inHg).

July 3

- 1800 UTC (11:00 a.m. PDT) – Hurricane Dalila weakens to a tropical storm about 255 mi (410 km) southwest of Manzanillo, Mexico.

July 4

- 1200 UTC (5:00 a.m. PDT) – Tropical Depression Five-E develops from an area of low pressure roughly 205 mi (330 km) southeast of Acapulco, Mexico.

July 5

- 0000 UTC (5:00 p.m. PDT July 4) – Tropical Storm Dalila weakens to a tropical depression about 440 mi (710 km) west-southwest of Manzanillo, Mexico.
- 0000 UTC (5:00 p.m. PDT July 4) – Tropical Depression Five-E intensifies into Tropical Storm Erick roughly 170 mi (275 km) south of Acapulco, Mexico.

July 6

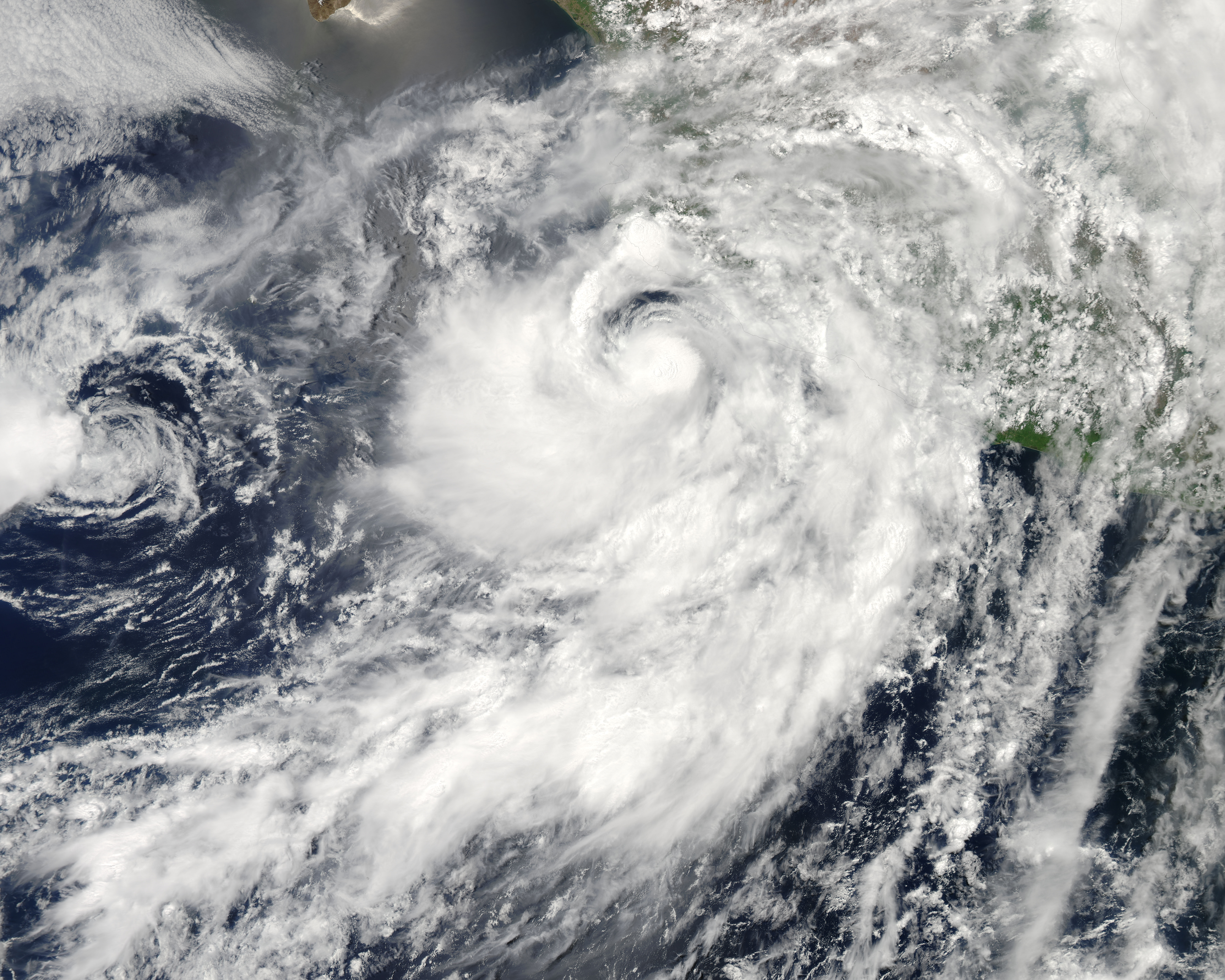
Hurricane Erick offshore southwestern Mexico on July 6

- 0600 UTC (11:00 p.m. PDT July 5) – Tropical Storm Erick intensifies into a Category 1 hurricane about 125 mi (200 km) southwest of Zihuatanejo, Mexico.
- 1200 UTC (5:00 a.m. PDT) – Hurricane Erick attains its peak intensity with maximum sustained winds of 80 mph (130 km/h) and a minimum barometric pressure of 983 mb (hPa; 29.03 inHg).

July 7

- 0600 UTC (11:00 p.m. PDT July 6) – Tropical Depression Dalila degenerates into a non-convective remnant area of low pressure roughly 460 mi (740 km) south-southwest of Cabo San Lucas, Mexico.
- 1800 UTC (11:00 a.m. PDT) – Hurricane Erick weakens to a tropical storm about 165 mi (265 km) west-southwest of Puerto Vallarta, Mexico.

July 9

- 0600 UTC (11:00 p.m. PDT July 8) – Tropical Storm Erick degenerates into a non-convective remnant area of low pressure roughly 115 mi (185 km) southwest of La Paz, Mexico.

July 25

- 0000 UTC (5:00 p.m. PDT July 24) – Tropical Depression Six-E develops from an area of low pressure about 980 mi 1,575 km) west-southwest of the southern tip of Baja California.
- 0600 UTC (11:00 p.m. PDT July 24) – Tropical Depression Six-E intensifies into Tropical Storm Flossie roughly 1,040 mi (1,675 km) southwest of the southern tip of Baja California.

July 27

- 1200 UTC (5:00 a.m. PDT) – Tropical Storm Flossie attains its peak intensity with maximum sustained winds of 70 mph (115 km/h) and a minimum barometric pressure of 994 mb (hPa; 29.36 inHg).
- ~1800 UTC (~11:00 a.m. PDT) – Tropical Storm Flossie crosses 140°W, entering the jurisdiction of the Central Pacific Hurricane Center.

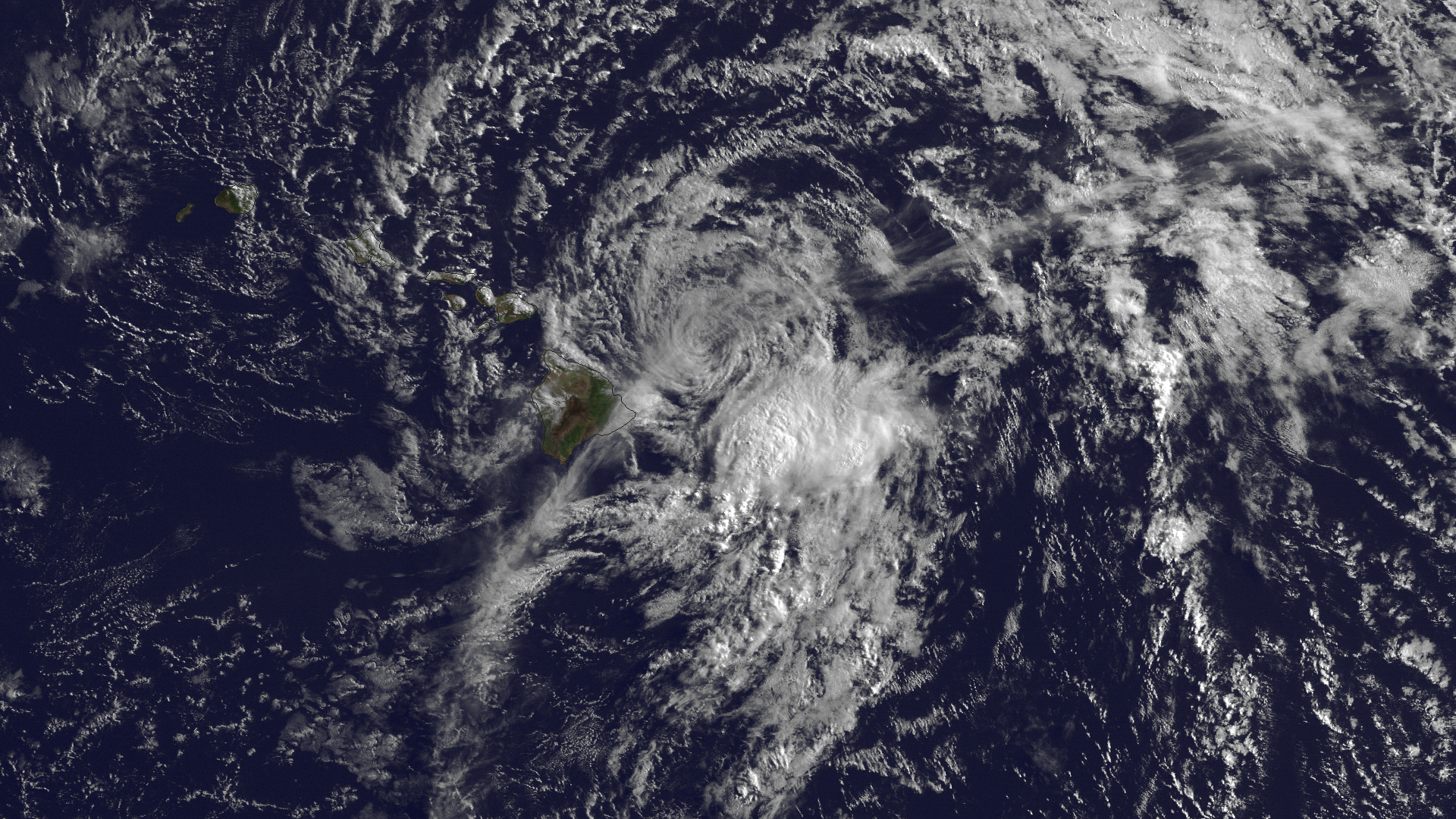
Tropical Storm Flossie offshore Hawaii on July 29

July 30

- 0000 UTC (5:00 p.m. PDT July 29) – Tropical Storm Flossie weakens to a tropical depression about 25 mi (40 km) northeast of Maui, Hawaii.
- 1200 UTC (5:00 a.m. PDT) – Tropical Depression Flossie degenerates into a non-convective remnant area of low pressure roughly 5 mi (8.0 km) of Kauai, Hawaii.
- 1200 UTC (5:00 a.m. PDT) – Tropical Depression Seven-E develops from an area of low pressure about 1,025 mi (1,650 km) south-southwest of the southern tip of Baja California.
- 1800 UTC (11:00 a.m. PDT) – Tropical Depression Seven-E intensifies into Tropical Storm Gil roughly 805 mi (1,295 km) southwest of the southern tip of Baja California.

July 31

- 1800 UTC (11:00 a.m. PDT) – Tropical Storm Gil intensifies into a Category 1 hurricane about 925 mi (1,490 km) southwest of the southern tip of Baja California.

=== August ===
August 2

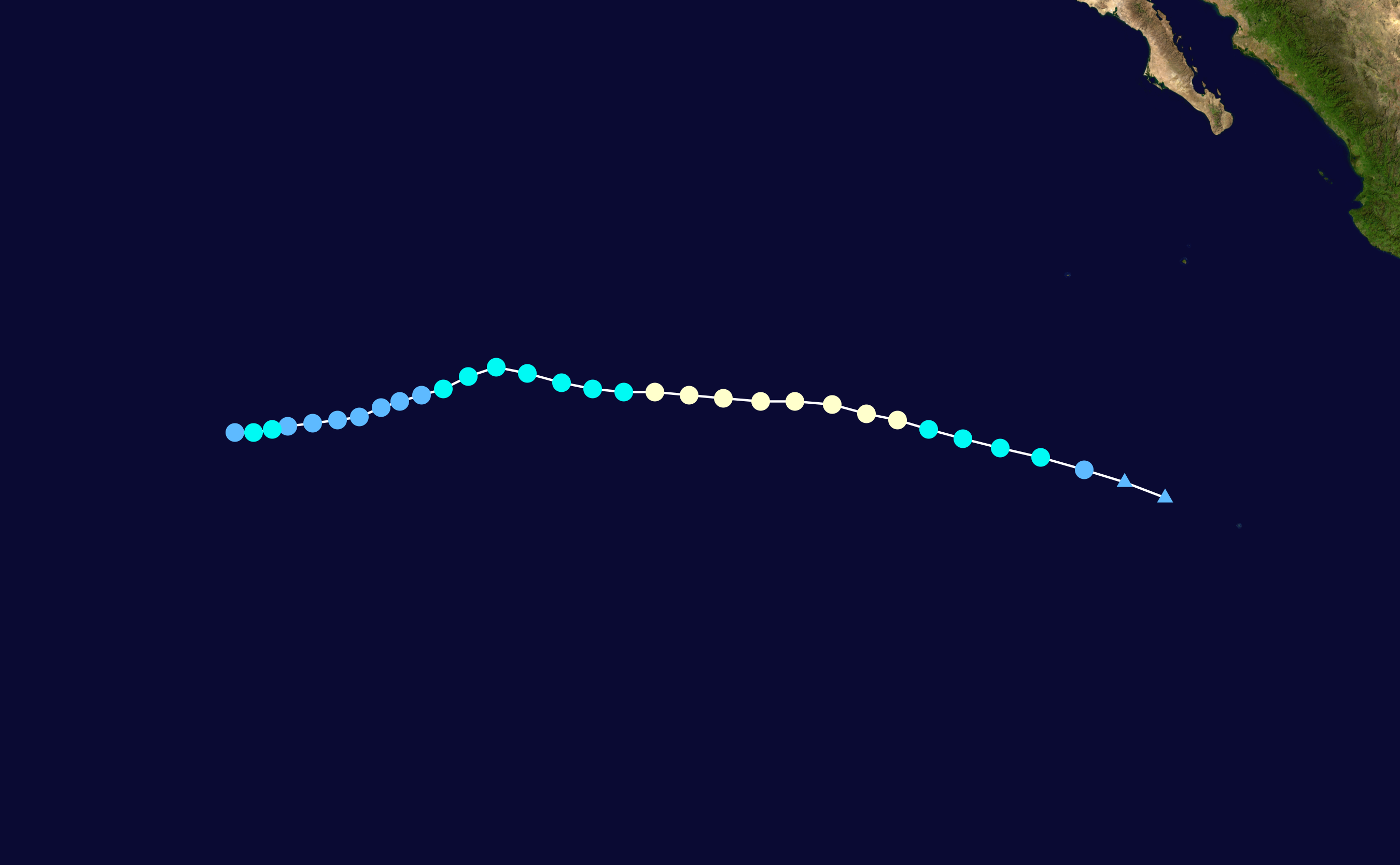
Storm path of Hurricane Gil

- 0000 UTC (5:00 p.m. PDT August 1) – Hurricane Gil attains its peak intensity with maximum sustained winds of 85 mph (135 km/h) and a minimum barometric pressure of 985 mb (hPa; 29.09 inHg).
- 1800 UTC (11:00 a.m. PDT) – Hurricane Gil weakens to a tropical storm roughly 1,370 mi (2,205 km) west-southwest of the southern tip of Baja California.

August 3

- 1200 UTC (5:00 a.m. PDT) – Tropical Depression Eight-E develops from an area of low pressure about 1,090 mi (1,755 km) southwest of the southern tip of Baja California.

August 4

- 0000 UTC (5:00 p.m. PDT August 3) – Tropical Depression Eight-E intensifies into Tropical Storm Henriette roughly 1,180 mi (1,900 km) southwest of the southern tip of Baja California.
- 1200 UTC (5:00 a.m. PDT) – Tropical Storm Gil weakens to a tropical depression about 1,325 mi (2,130 km) east-southeast of the Hawaiian Islands.

August 6

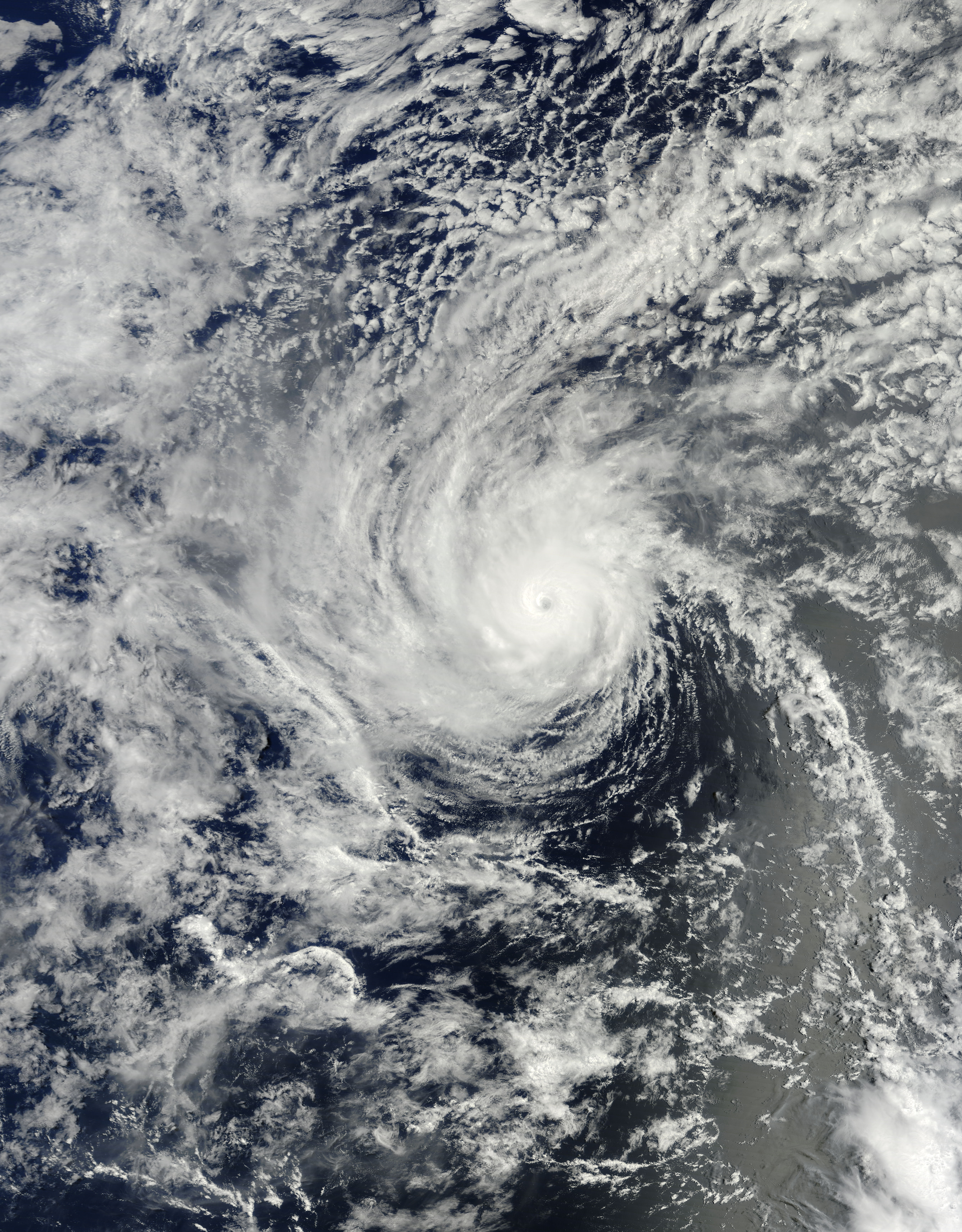
Hurricane Henriette at peak intensity on August 8

- ~0000 UTC (~5:00 p.m. PDT August 5) – Tropical Depression Gil crosses 140°W, entering the jurisdiction of the Central Pacific.
- 0600 UTC (11:00 p.m. PDT August 5) – Tropical Depression Gil re-intensifies into a tropical storm roughly 1,055 mi (1,700 km) southeast of the Hawaiian Islands.
- 0600 UTC (11:00 p.m. PDT August 5) – Tropical Storm Henriette intensifies into a Category 1 hurricane about 1,495 mi (2,405 km) west-southwest of the southern tip of Baja California.
- 1800 UTC (11:00 a.m. PDT) – Tropical Storm Gil weakens to a tropical depression for a second time roughly 985 mi (1,585 km) southeast of the Hawaiian Islands.

August 7

- 0000 UTC (5:00 p.m. PDT August 6) – Tropical Depression Gil dissipates about 1,065 mi (1,715 km) east-southeast of the Hawaiian Islands.

August 8

- 1800 UTC (11:00 a.m. PDT) – Hurricane Henriette intensifies into a Category 2 hurricane and simultaneously attains its peak intensity with maximum sustained winds of 105 mph (170 km/h) and a minimum barometric pressure of 976 mb (hPa; 28.82 inHg).

August 9

- ~0000 UTC (~5:00 p.m. PDT August 8) – Hurricane Henriette crosses 140°W, entering the jurisdiction of the Central Pacific Hurricane Center.
- 0600 UTC (11:00 p.m. PDT August 8) – Hurricane Henriette weakens to a Category 1 hurricane roughly 945 mi (1,520 km) east-southeast of the Hawaiian Islands.
- 1200 UTC (5:00 a.m. PDT) – Hurricane Henriette weakens to a tropical storm about 885 mi (1,425 km) southeast of the Hawaiian Islands.

August 11

- 1200 UTC (5:00 a.m. PDT) – Tropical Storm Henriette weakens to a tropical depression roughly 380 mi (610 km) south of Ka Lae, Hawaii.
- 1800 UTC (11:00 a.m. PDT) – Tropical Depression Henriette degenerates into a non-convective remnant area of low pressure about 385 mi (620 km) south-southwest of Ka Lae, Hawaii.

August 16

- 1500 UTC (5:00 a.m. HST) – Tropical Storm Pewa develops from an area of low pressure roughly 1,240 mi (1,995 km) southwest of Lihue, Hawaii.

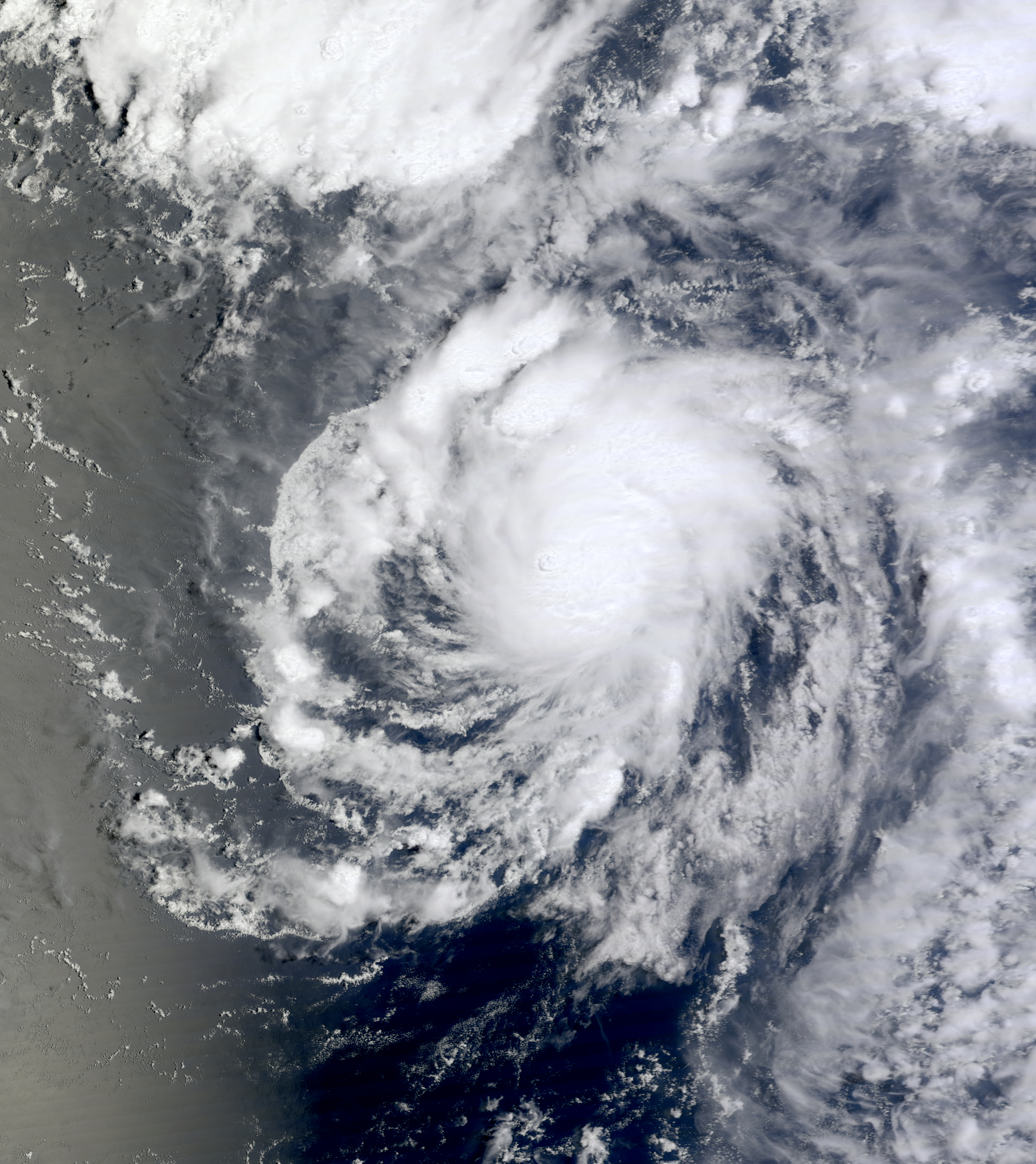
Tropical Storm Pewa over the Central Pacific on August 17

August 18

- ~0600 UTC (~8:00 p.m. HST August 17) – Tropical Storm Pewa crosses the International Date Line and moves into the West Pacific.

August 19

- 0300 UTC (5:00 p.m. HST August 18) – Tropical Storm Unala develops from an area of low pressure about 1,360 mi (2,190 km) west of Honolulu, Hawaii.
- ~0900 UTC (~11:00 p.m. HST August 18) – Tropical Storm Unala crosses the International Date Line and moves into the West Pacific.
- 2100 UTC (11:00 a.m. HST) – Tropical Depression Three-C develops from an area of low pressure roughly 1,075 mi (1,730 km) west of Lihue, Hawaii.

August 20

- ~1500 UTC (~5:00 a.m. HST) – Tropical Depression Three-C crosses the International Date Line and moves into the West Pacific basin.

August 22

- 1200 UTC (5:00 a.m. PDT) – Tropical Depression Nine-E develops from an area of low pressure about 495 mi (795 km) west-southwest of Manzanillo, Mexico.

August 23

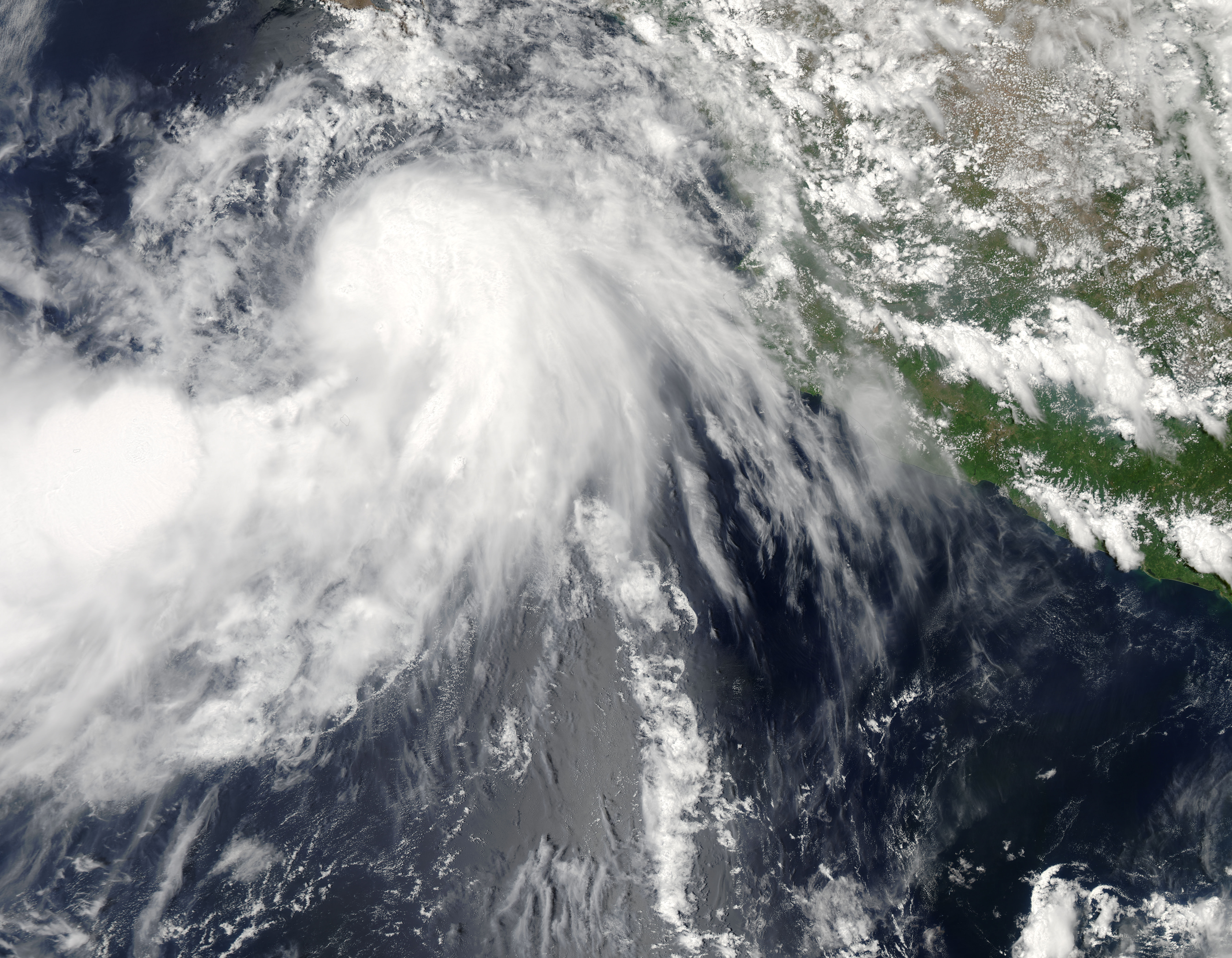
Tropical Storm Ivo south of Baja California on August 23

- 0000 UTC (5:00 p.m. PDT August 22) – Tropical Depression Nine-E intensifies into Tropical Storm Ivo roughly 385 mi (620 km) south-southwest of the southern tip of Baja California.

August 24

- 0000 UTC (5:00 p.m. PDT August 23) – Tropical Storm Ivo attains its peak intensity with maximum sustained winds of 45 mph (70 km/h) and a minimum barometric pressure of 997 mb (hPa; 29.44 inHg).

August 25

- 0000 UTC (5:00 p.m. PDT August 24) – Tropical Storm Ivo weakens to a tropical depression about 265 mi (425 km) west of the southern tip of Baja California.
- 1800 UTC (11:00 a.m. PDT) – Tropical Depression Ivo degenerates into a non-convective remnant area of low pressure roughly 325 mi (525 km) northwest of La Paz, Mexico.

August 28

- 1200 UTC (5:00 a.m. PDT) – Tropical Storm Juliette develops from an area of low pressure about 310 mi (500 km) south-southeast of Cabo San Lucas, Mexico.

August 29

- 0600 UTC (11:00 p.m. PDT August 28) – Tropical Storm Juliette attains its peak intensity with maximum sustained winds of 65 mph (105 km/h) and a minimum barometric pressure of 997 mb (hPa; 29.44 inHg).
- 0900 UTC (2:00 a.m. PDT) – Tropical Storm Juliette makes landfall near Punta Santa Marina, Mexico, with winds of 65 mph (105 km/h).

August 30

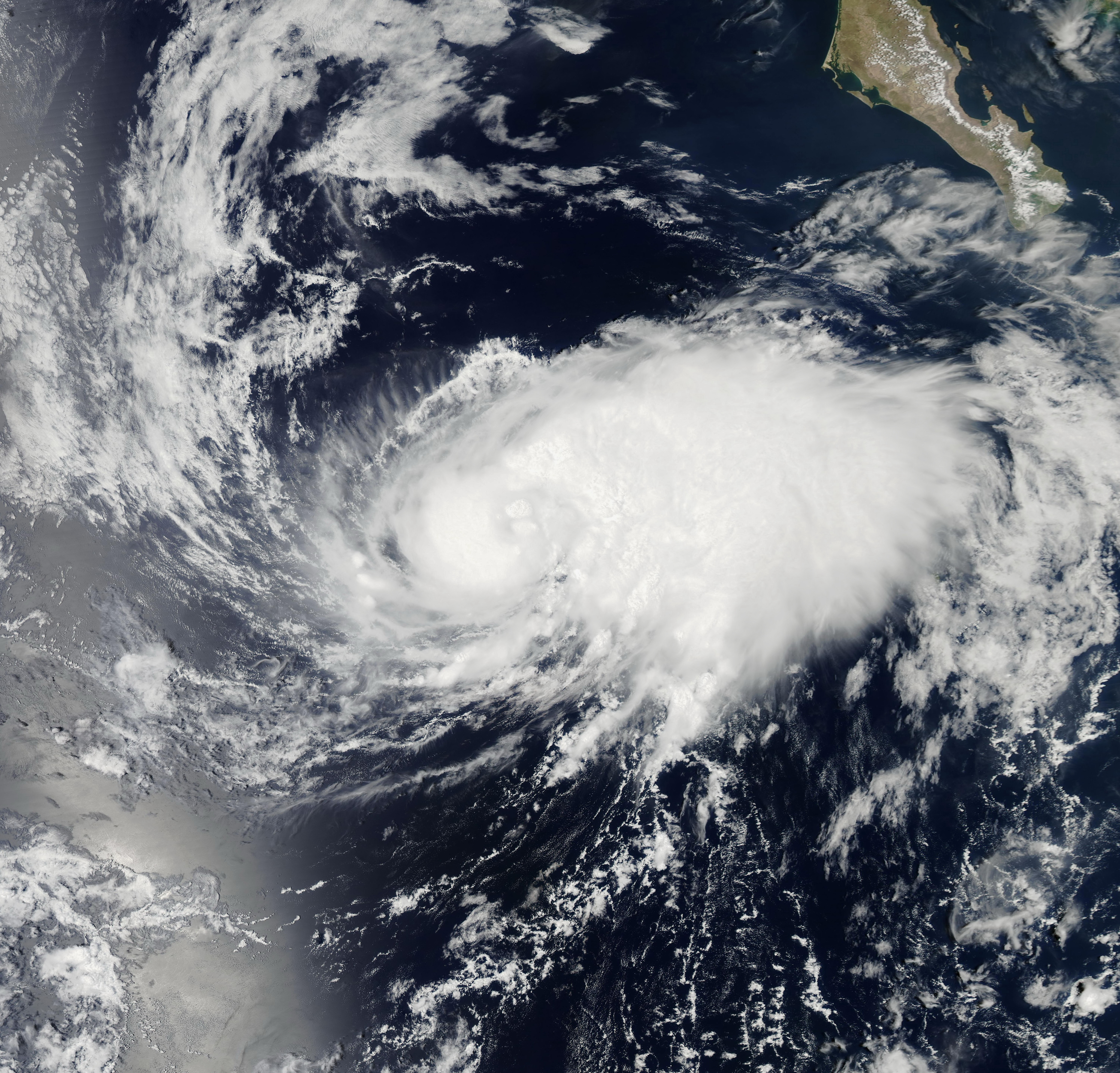
Tropical Storm Kiko near hurricane status on August 31

- 0000 UTC (5:00 p.m. PDT August 29) – Tropical Storm Juliette degenerates into a non-convective remnant area of low pressure roughly 50 mi (80 km) south of El Pocito, Mexico.
- 1200 UTC (5:00 a.m. PDT) – Tropical Depression Eleven-E develops from an area of low pressure about 530 mi (855 km) southwest of the southern tip of Baja California.

August 31

- 1200 UTC (5:00 a.m. PDT) – Tropical Depression Eleven-E intensifies into Tropical Storm Kiko roughly 500 mi (805 km) west-southwest of the southern tip of Baja California.

=== September ===
September 1

- 0600 UTC (11:00 p.m. PDT August 31) – Tropical Storm Kiko intensifies into a Category 1 hurricane and simultaneously attains its peak intensity with maximum sustained winds of 75 mph (120 km/h) and a minimum barometric pressure of 989 mb (hPa; 29.21 inHg).
- 1800 UTC (11:00 a.m. PDT) – Hurricane Kiko weakens to a tropical storm about 380 mi (610 km) west-southwest of the southern tip of Baja California.

September 2

- 1200 UTC (5:00 a.m. PDT) – Tropical Storm Kiko degenerates into a non-convective remnant area of low pressure roughly 405 mi (650 km) west-southwest of the southern tip of Baja California.

September 5

- 0600 UTC (11:00 p.m. PDT September 4) – Tropical Depression Twelve-E develops from an area of low pressure about 145 mi (235 km) southwest of Manzanillo, Mexico.
- 1200 UTC (5:00 a.m. PDT) – Tropical Depression Twelve-E intensifies into Tropical Storm Lorena roughly 135 mi (215 km) southwest of Manzanillo, Mexico.

September 6

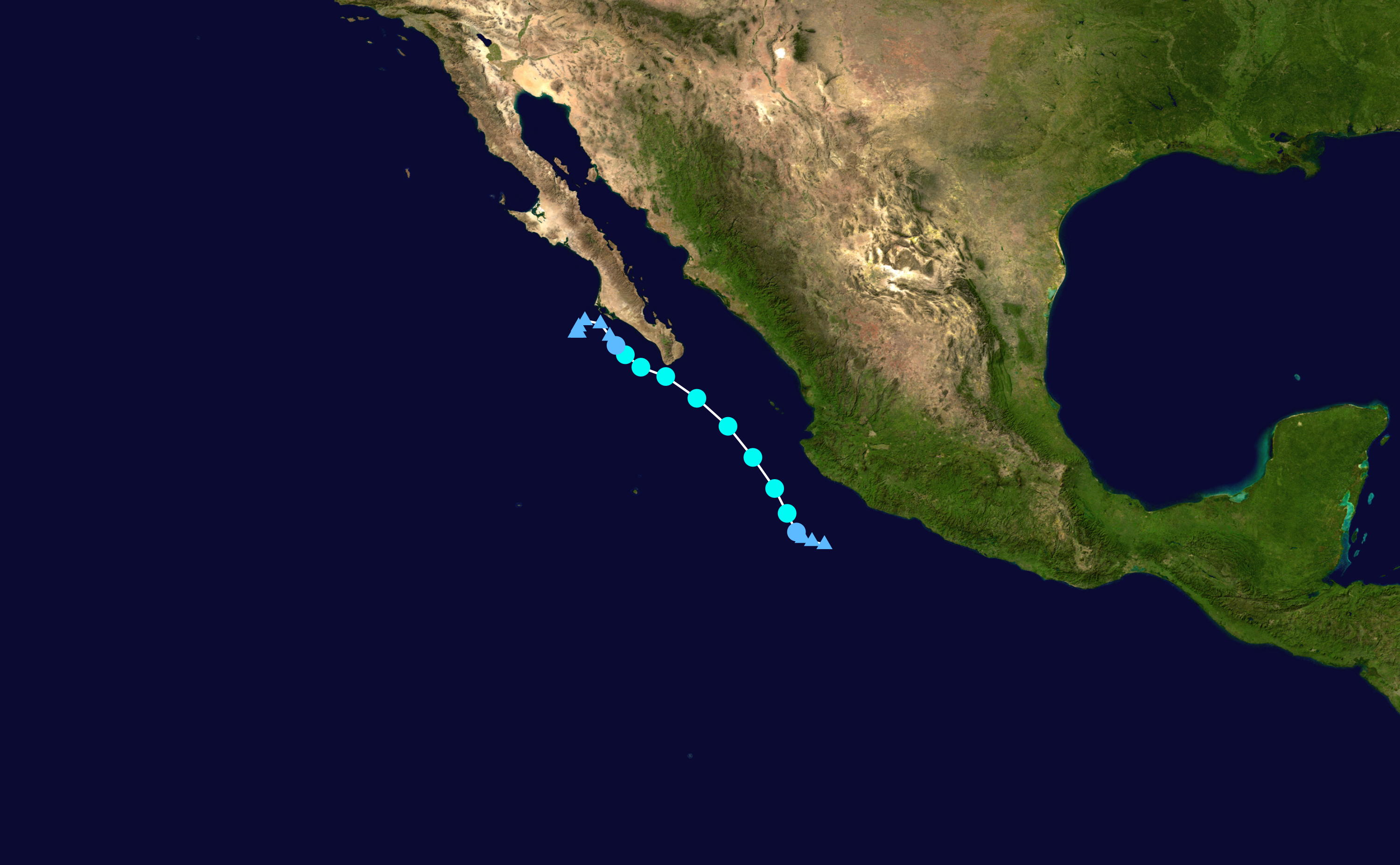
Storm path of Tropical Storm Lorena

- 1200 UTC (5:00 a.m. PDT) – Tropical Storm Lorena attains its peak intensity with maximum sustained winds of 50 mph (80 km/h) and a minimum barometric pressure of 1002 mb (hPa; 29.59 inHg).

September 7

- 1200 UTC (5:00 a.m. PDT) – Tropical Storm Lorena weakens to a tropical depression about 95 mi (155 km) southwest of La Paz, Mexico.
- 1800 UTC (11:00 a.m. PDT) – Tropical Depression Lorena degenerates into a non-convective remnant area of low pressure roughly 60 mi (95 km) west-southwest of Santa Fe, Mexico.

September 13

- 1200 UTC (5:00 a.m. PDT) – Tropical Depression Thirteen-E develops from an area of low pressure about 150 mi (240 km) south-southwest of Acapulco, Mexico.
- 1800 UTC (11:00 a.m. PDT) – Tropical Depression Thirteen-E intensifies into Tropical Storm Manuel roughly 175 mi (280 km) southwest of Acapulco, Mexico.

September 15

- 1200 UTC (5:00 a.m. PDT) – Tropical Storm Manuel makes its first landfall near Pichilinguillo, Mexico, with winds of 70 mph (115 km/h).

September 16

- 0000 UTC (5:00 p.m. PDT September 15) – Tropical Storm Manuel weakens to a tropical depression about 45 mi (70 km) north-northwest of Manzanillo, Mexico.
- 0600 UTC (11:00 p.m. PDT September 15) – Tropical Depression Manuel degenerates into a tropical disturbance roughly 30 mi (50 km) south of Puerto Vallarta, Mexico.

September 17

- 1800 UTC (11:00 a.m. PDT) – The remnants of Tropical Depression Manuel regenerate into a tropical depression about 175 mi (280 km) east of Cabo San Lucas, Mexico.

September 18

- 0600 UTC (11:00 p.m. PDT September 17) – Tropical Depression Manuel intensifies into a tropical storm roughly 140 mi (225 km) east of Cabo San Lucas, Mexico.

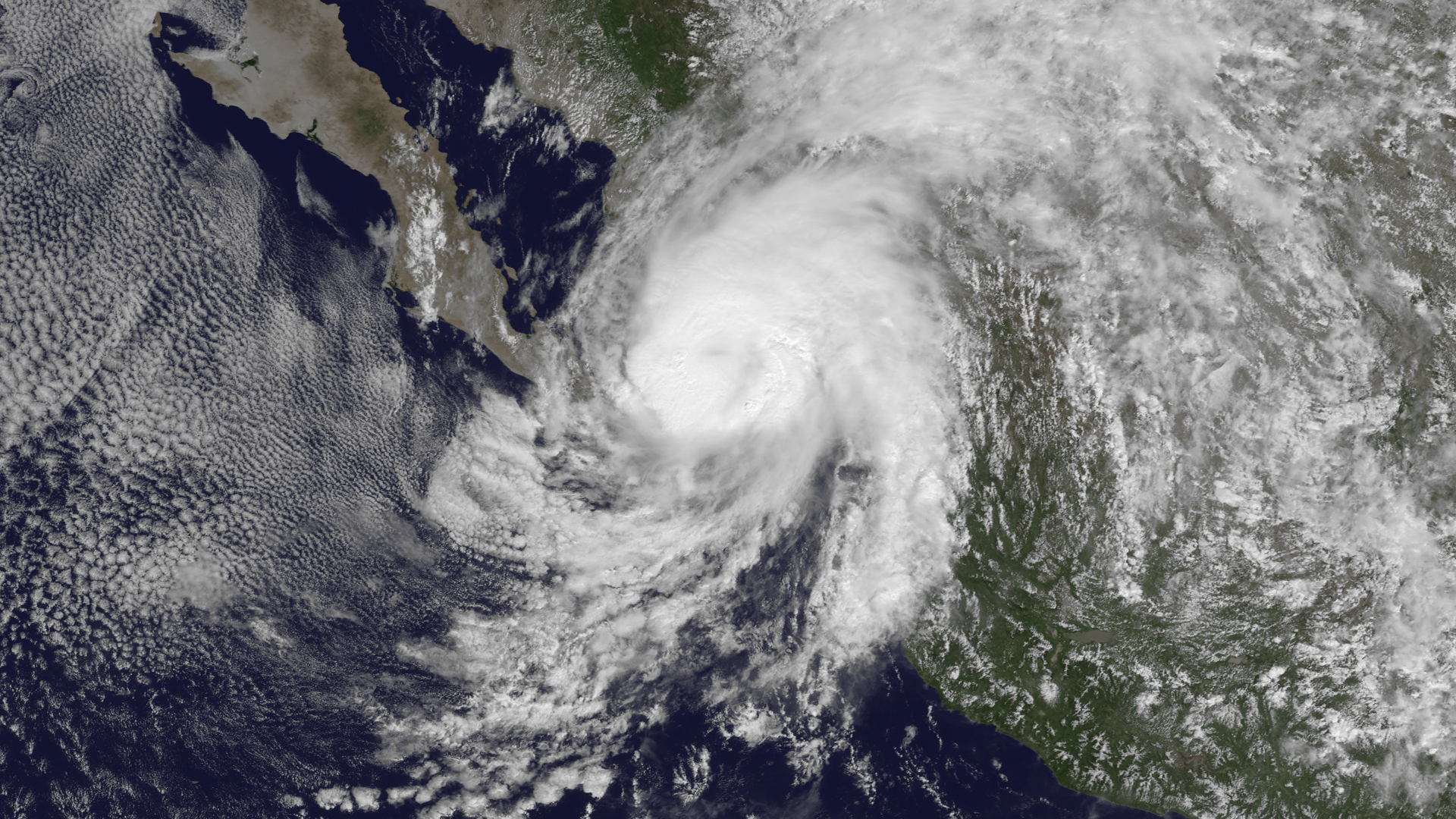
Tropical Storm Manuel near hurricane intensity on September 18

September 19

- 0000 UTC (5:00 p.m. PDT September 18) – Tropical Storm Manuel intensifies into a Category 1 hurricane about 140 mi (225 km) northeast of Cabo San Lucas, Mexico.
- 0600 UTC (11:00 p.m. PDT September 18) – Hurricane Manuel attains its peak intensity with maximum sustained winds of 75 mph (120 km/h) and a minimum barometric pressure of 983 mb (hPa; 29.03 inHg).
- 1200 UTC (5:00 a.m. PDT) – Hurricane Manuel makes its second and final landfall near Culiacán, Mexico, with winds of 75 mph (120 km/h).
- 1800 UTC (11:00 a.m. PDT) – Hurricane Manuel weakens to a tropical storm roughly 30 mi (50 km) east-southeast of Guamúchil, Mexico.

September 20

- 0000 UTC (5:00 p.m. PDT September 19) – Tropical Storm Manuel dissipates over the Sierra Madre Occidental.

=== October ===
October 6

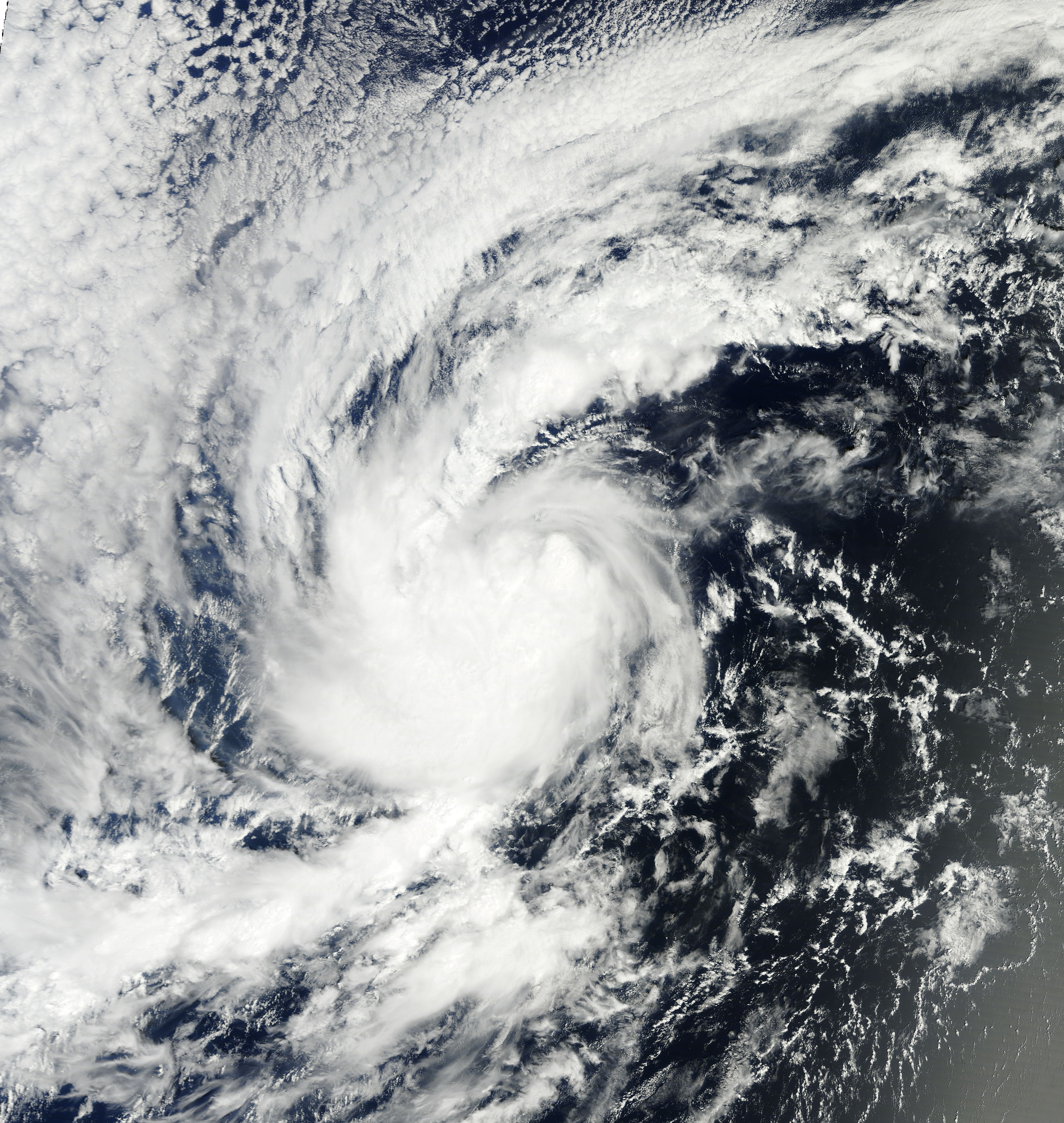
Tropical Storm Narda on October 8

- 1800 UTC (11:00 a.m. PDT) – Tropical Depression Fourteen-E develops from an area of low pressure about 865 mi (1,390 km) southwest of the southern tip of Baja California.

October 7

- 0000 UTC (5:00 .m. PDT October 6) – Tropical Depression Fourteen-E intensifies into Tropical Storm Narda roughly 915 mi (1,475 km) southwest of the southern tip of Baja California.
- 1800 UTC (11:00 a.m. PDT) – Tropical Storm Narda attains its peak intensity with maximum sustained winds of 65 mph (105 km/h) and a minimum barometric pressure of 997 mb (hPa; 29.44 inHg).

October 9

- 0000 UTC (5:00 p.m. PDT October 8) – Tropical Storm Narda weakens to a tropical depression about 1,245 mi (2,005 km) west-southwest of the southern tip of Baja California.

October 10

- 1200 UTC (5:00 a.m. PDT) – Tropical Depression Narda degenerates into a non-convective remnant area of low pressure roughly 1,320 mi (2,125 km) west-southwest of the southern tip of Baja California.

October 12

- 1800 UTC (11:00 a.m. PDT) – Tropical Depression Fifteen-E develops from an area of low pressure about 545 mi (875 km) south of the southern tip of Baja California.

October 13

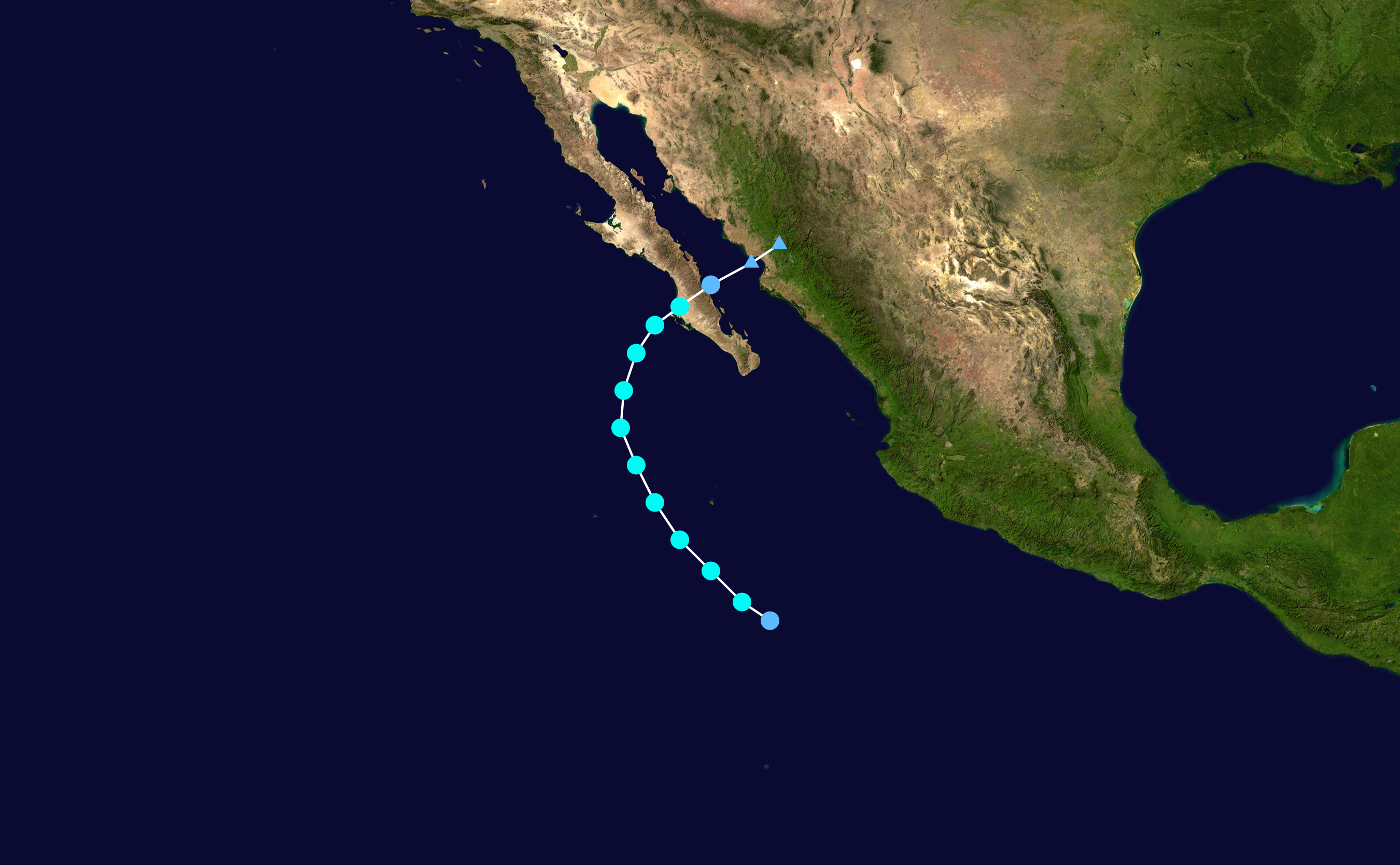
Storm path of Tropical Storm Octave

- 0000 UTC (5:00 p.m. PDT October 12) – Tropical Depression Fifteen-E intensifies into Tropical Storm Octave roughly 500 mi (805 km) south of the southern tip of Baja California.
- 1800 UTC (11:00 a.m. PDT) – Tropical Storm Octave attains its peak intensity with maximum sustained winds of 65 mph (105 km/h) and a minimum barometric pressure of 994 mb (hPa; 29.36 inHg).

October 14

- 0000 UTC (5:00 p.m. PDT October 13) – Tropical Depression Sixteen-E develops from an area of low pressure about 810 mi (1,305 km) south-southwest of the southern tip of Baja California.
- 0600 UTC (11:00 p.m. PDT October 13) – Tropical Depression Sixteen-E intensifies into Tropical Storm Priscilla roughly 740 mi (1,190 km) southwest of the southern tip of Baja California.
- 1200 UTC (5:00 a.m. PDT) – Tropical Storm Priscilla attains its peak intensity with maximum sustained winds of 45 mph (70 km/h) and a minimum barometric pressure of 1001 mb (hPa; 29.56 inHg).

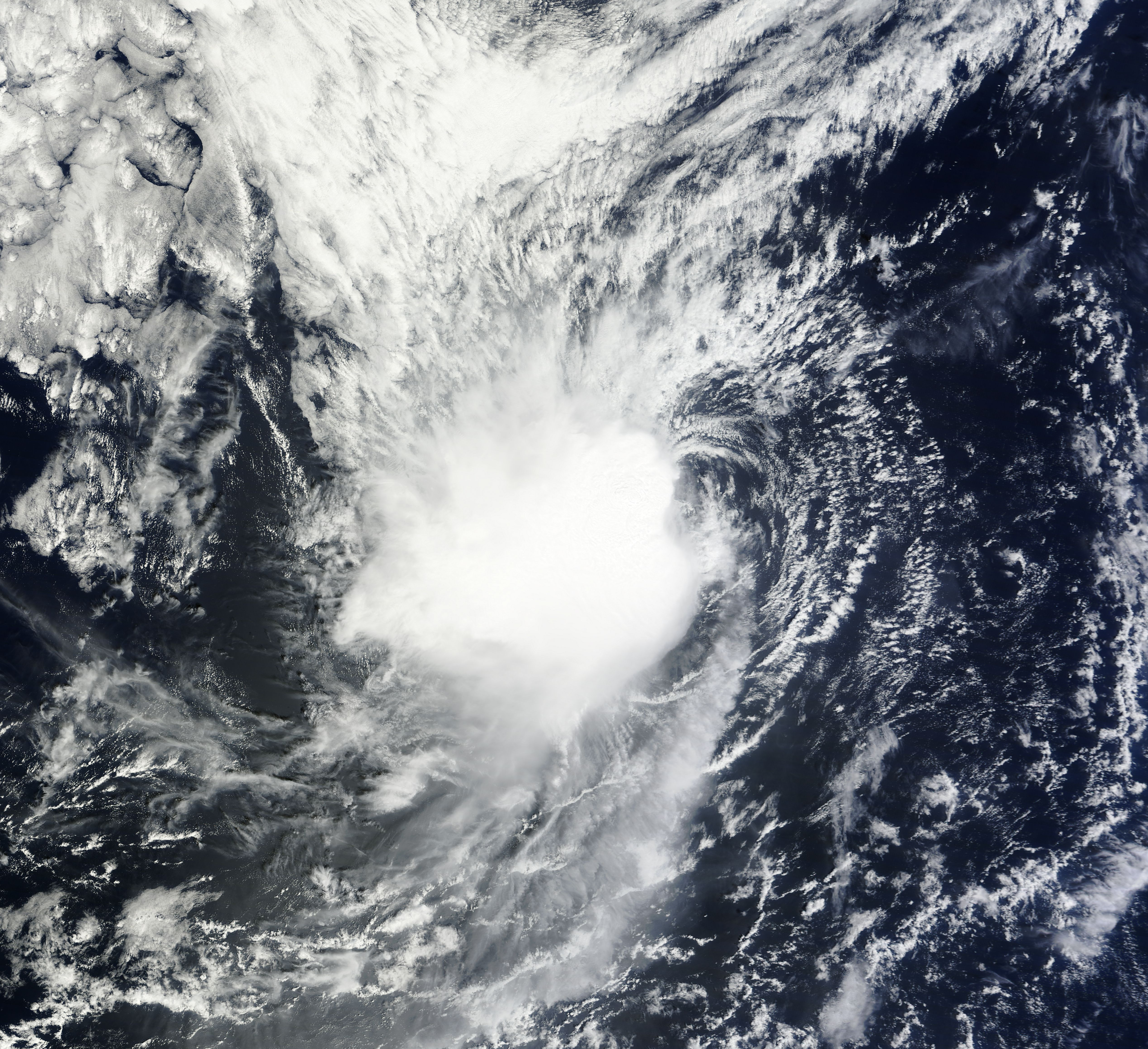
Tropical Storm Priscilla near peak intensity on October 14

October 15

- 0500 UTC (10:00 p.m. PDT October 14) – Tropical Storm Octave makes landfall near Cabo San Lazaro, Mexico, with winds of 45 mph (70 km/h).
- 1200 UTC (5:00 a.m. PDT) – Tropical Storm Octave weakens to a tropical depression about 120 mi (195 km) north-northwest of La Paz, Mexico.
- 1800 UTC (11:00 a.m. PDT) – Tropical Depression Octave degenerates into a non-convective remnant area of low pressure roughly 65 mi (105 km) northwest of Los Mochis, Mexico.
- 1800 UTC (11:00 a.m. PDT) – Tropical Storm Priscilla weakens to a tropical depression about 585 mi (940 km) southwest of the southern tip of Baja California.

October 16

- 1800 UTC (11:00 a.m. PDT) – Tropical Depression Priscilla degenerates into a non-convective remnant area of low pressure roughly 720 mi (1,160 km) west-southwest of the southern tip of Baja California.

October 20

- 0000 UTC (5:00 p.m. PDT October 19) – Tropical Depression Seventeen-E develops from an area of low pressure about 220 mi (355 km) south-southwest of Acapulco, Mexico.
- 0600 UTC (11:00 p.m. PDT October 19) – Tropical Depression Seventeen-E intensifies into Tropical Storm Raymond roughly 195 mi (315 km) southwest of Acapulco, Mexico.

October 21

- 0000 UTC (5:00 p.m. PDT October 20) – Tropical Storm Raymond intensifies into a Category 1 hurricane about 160 mi (255 km) southwest of Acapulco, Mexico.
- 0600 UTC (11:00 p.m. PDT October 21) – Hurricane Raymond intensifies into a Category 2 hurricane roughly 165 mi (265 km) west-southwest of Acapulco, Mexico.
- 1200 UTC (5:00 a.m. PDT) – Hurricane Raymond intensifies into a Category 3 hurricane about 160 mi (255 km) west-southwest of Acapulco, Mexico.
- 1800 UTC (11:00 a.m. PDT) – Hurricane Raymond attains its peak intensity with maximum sustained winds of 125 mph (200 km/h) and a minimum barometric pressure of 28.08 inHg).

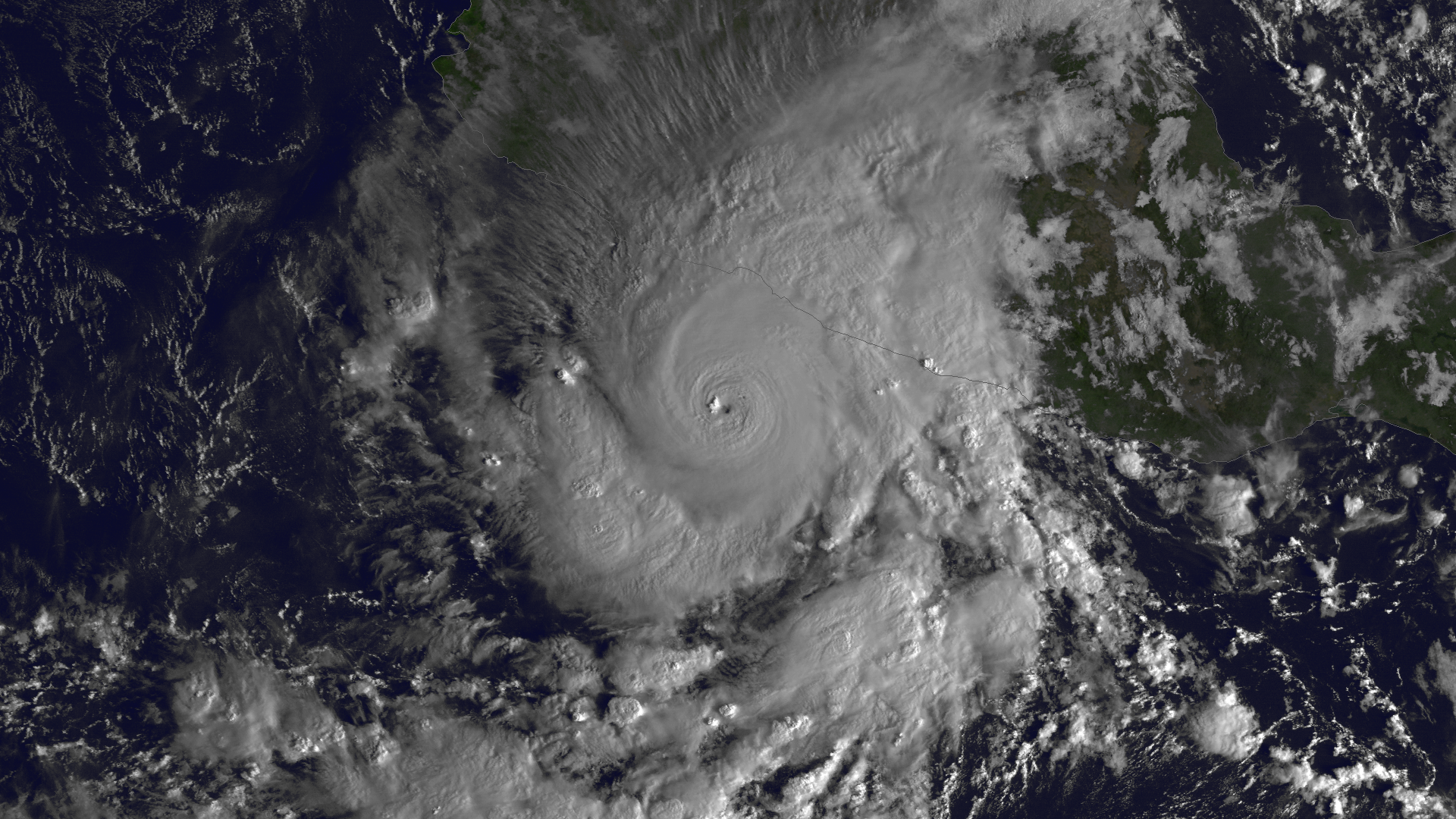
Raymond as a major hurricane on October 21

October 22

- 0600 UTC (11:00 p.m. PDT October 21) – Hurricane Raymond weakens to a Category 2 hurricane roughly 135 mi (215 km) west-southwest of Acapulco, Mexico.
- 1800 UTC (11:00 a.m. PDT) – Hurricane Raymond weakens to a Category 1 hurricane about 135 mi (215 km) west-southwest of Acapulco, Mexico.

October 23

- 0600 UTC (11:00 p.m. PDT October 22) – Hurricane Raymond weakens to a tropical storm roughly 170 mi (275 km) southwest of Acapulco, Mexico.

October 27

- 1200 UTC (5:00 a.m. PDT) – Tropical Storm Raymond re-intensifies into a Category 1 hurricane about 730 mi (1,175 km) south-southwest of the southern tip of Baja California.

October 28

- 0000 UTC (5:00 p.m. PDT October 27) – Hurricane Raymond re-intensifies into a Category 2 hurricane roughly 715 mi (1,150 km) southwest of the southern tip of Baja California.
- 1200 UTC (5:00 a.m. PDT) – Hurricane Raymond weakens to a Category 1 hurricane for a second time about 660 mi (1,060 km) southwest of the southern tip of Baja California.

October 29

- 0000 UTC (5:00 p.m. PDT October 28) – Hurricane Raymond weakens to a tropical storm for a second time roughly 620 mi (1,000 km) southwest of the southern tip of Baja California.

October 30

- 0600 UTC (11:00 p.m. PDT October 29) – Tropical Storm Raymond weakens to a tropical depression about 420 mi (675 km) southwest of the southern tip of Baja California.
- 1200 UTC (5:00 a.m. PDT) – Tropical Depression Raymond degenerates into a non-convective remnant area of low pressure roughly 370 mi (595 km) west-southwest of the southern tip of Baja California.

=== November ===
November 1

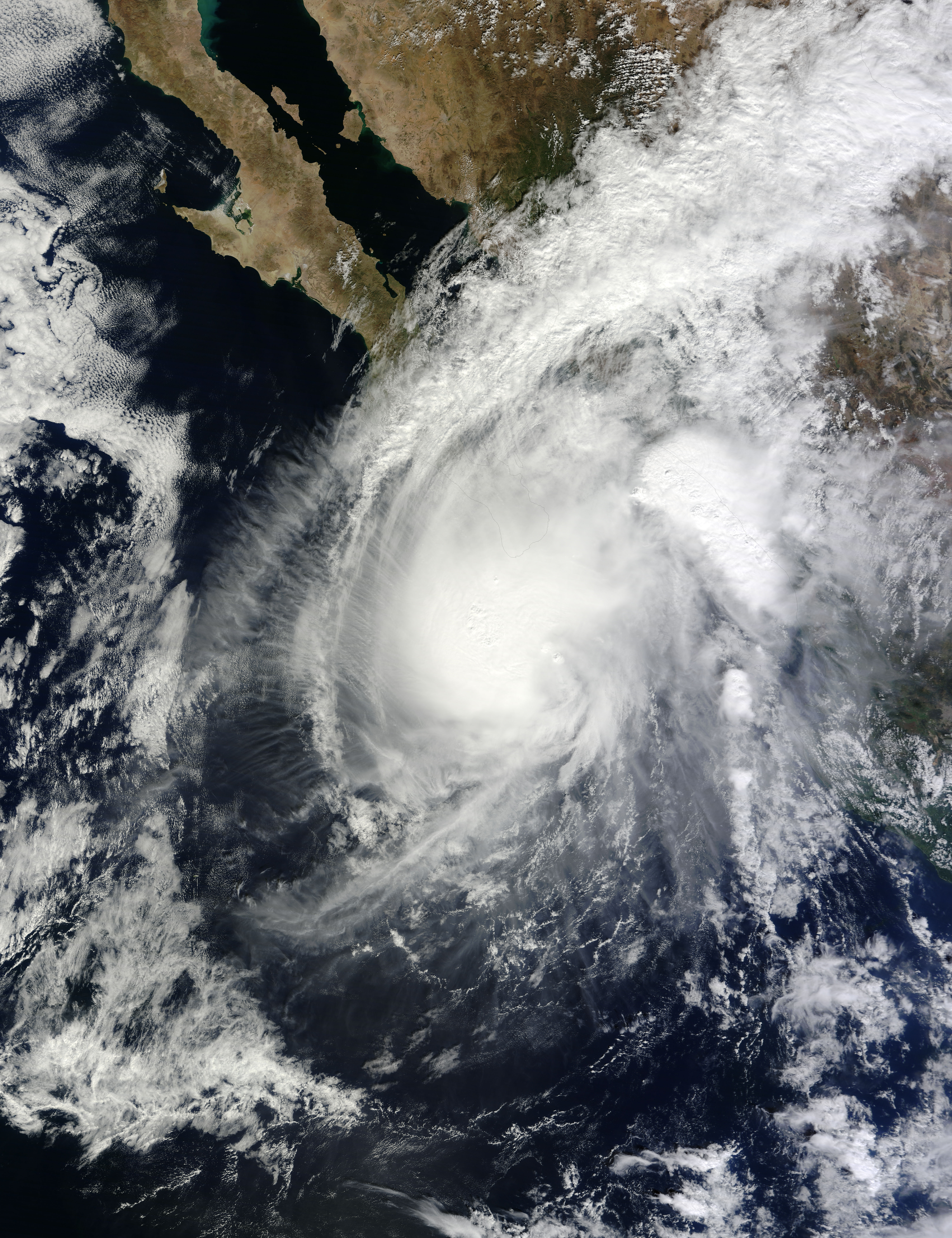
Tropical Storm Sonia at peak intensity on November 3

- 0600 UTC (11:00 p.m. PDT October 31) – Tropical Depression Eighteen-E develops from an area of low pressure about 320 mi (515 km) southwest of Manzanillo, Mexico.

November 3

- 0000 UTC (4:00 p.m. PST November 2) – Tropical Depression Eighteen-E intensifies into Tropical Storm Sonia roughly 350 mi (565 km) south of the southern tip of Baja California.
- 1800 UTC (10:00 a.m. PST) – Tropical Storm Sonia attains its peak intensity with maximum sustained winds of 45 mph (70 km/h) and a minimum barometric pressure of 1002 mb (hPa; 29.59 inHg).

November 4

- 0500 UTC (9:00 p.m. PST November 3) – Tropical Storm Sonia makes landfall near El Dorado, Mexico, with winds of 40 mph (65 km/h).
- 0600 UTC (10:00 p.m. PST November 3) – Tropical Storm Sonia weakens to a tropical depression about 20 mi (30 km) north-northwest of El Dorado, Mexico.
- 1200 UTC (4:00 a.m. PST) – Tropical Depression Sonia dissipates over the Sierra Madre Occidental.

November 30

- The 2013 Pacific hurricane season officially ends.

== See also ==
- List of Pacific hurricanes
- Timeline of the 2013 Atlantic hurricane season
