= Hurricane Cosme (2013) =

Category 1 Pacific hurricane in 2013

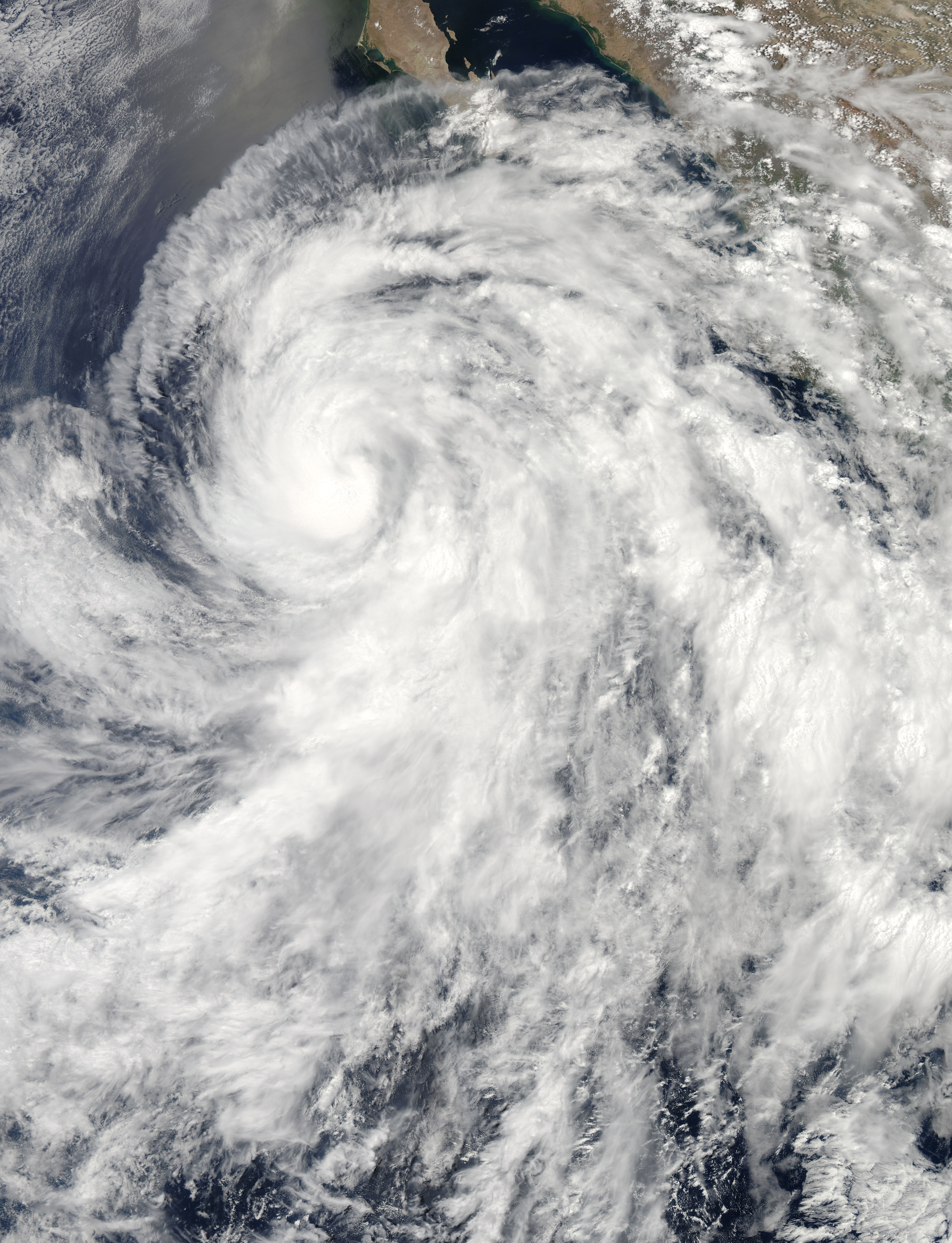
- Cosme near peak intensity on June 25, 2013

Meteorological history
- Formed: June 23, 2013
- Remnant low: June 27, 2013
- Dissipated: July 1, 2013

Category 1 hurricane
- 1-minute sustained (SSHWS/NWS)
- Highest winds: 85 mph (140 km/h)
- Lowest pressure: 980 mbar (hPa); 28.94 inHg

Overall effects
- Fatalities: 3 confirmed
- Damage: Minimal
- Areas affected: Western Mexico, Baja California Peninsula
- IBTrACS
- Part of the 2013 Pacific hurricane season

Hurricane Cosme was a moderately strong tropical cyclone that caused flooding along the Pacific coast of Mexico in June 2013. The third named tropical cyclone of the 2013 Pacific hurricane season, the storm system formed from a tropical wave south of Manzanillo, Colima, on June 23. The cyclone intensified into a tropical storm on June 24, and soon after strengthened into a hurricane on June 25. Early the following day, Cosme attained its peak intensity as a Category 1 hurricane on the Saffir–Simpson scale with maximum sustained winds of 85 mph (140 km/h) and a minimum barometric pressure of 980 mbar (hPa; 28.94 inHg). However, Cosme then began to encounter stable air and lower sea surface temperatures, causing the system to weaken to a tropical storm late on June 26. The system continued to weaken and degenerated into a remnant low pressure surface trough about 690 mi (1,110 km) west-southwest of Cabo San Lucas, Mexico, on June 27. The remnants persisted until dissipating well east-southeast of the Hawaiian Islands on July 1.

In anticipation of the storm, the Servicio Meteorológico Nacional of Mexico issued a blue alert (minimum risk) for the states of Guerrero, Nayarit, and Baja California Sur; and a green alert (low risk) for Michoacan, Jalisco, and Colima. The outer rainbands brought moderate rains to Guerrero, causing minor flooding in Acapulco. Across the state, the storm generated 24 landslides, which blocked highways. Two people were killed in the Guerrero, one a tourist that drowned in Zihuatanejo and the other a police officer in an airplane crash that injured 19 others. High seas flooded numerous buildings across coastal towns in Colima, damaging 34 tourist facilities and killing one person. Additionally, many restaurants built of wood and coconut were damaged. The port in Manzanillo was closed to small craft, as was the port of Mazatlan. Overall, 50 homes were damaged by the storm. Cosme also brought rough seas and gale force winds to the Revillagigedo Islands.

== Meteorological history ==
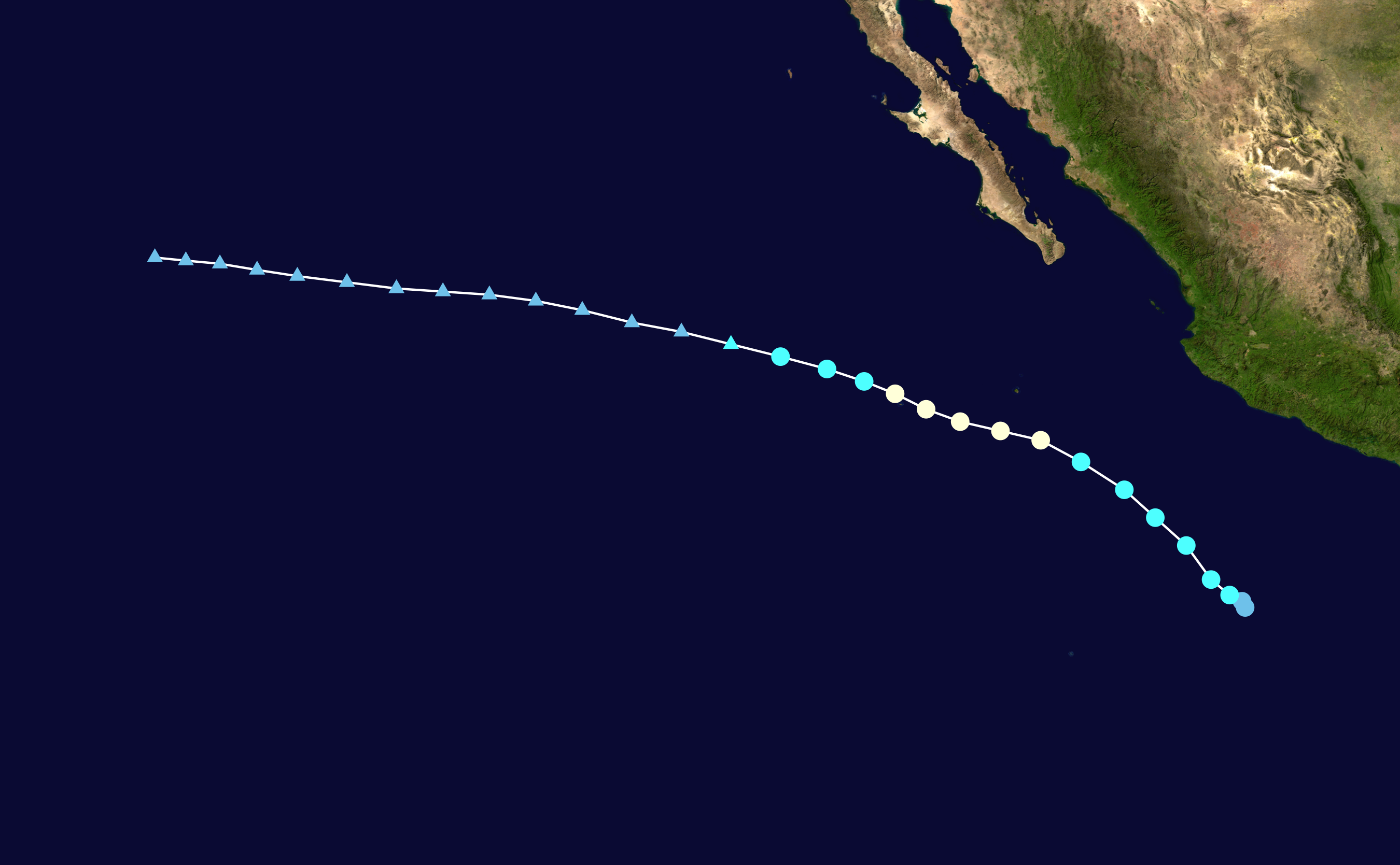
Map plotting the storm's track and intensity, according to the Saffir–Simpson scale Map key Saffir–Simpson scale Tropical depression (≤38 mph, ≤62 km/h) Tropical storm (39–73 mph, 63–118 km/h) Category 1 (74–95 mph, 119–153 km/h) Category 2 (96–110 mph, 154–177 km/h) Category 3 (111–129 mph, 178–208 km/h) Category 4 (130–156 mph, 209–251 km/h) Category 5 (≥157 mph, ≥252 km/h) Unknown Storm type Tropical cyclone Subtropical cyclone Extratropical cyclone, remnant low, tropical disturbance, or monsoon depression

Hurricane Cosme can be traced to a tropical wave that formed on the west coast of Africa on or around June 8. That westward moving wave, which was also responsible for the formation of Tropical Storm Barry in the Caribbean Sea, eventually reached the Eastern Pacific Ocean. The progress of the wave was slowed by a southwesterly movement within the Intertropical Convergence Zone. During the morning hours of June 20, the National Hurricane Center (NHC) began monitoring a broad area of disturbed weather several hundred miles southeast of Acapulco, Mexico. Assessed with a low chance of tropical cyclone formation within a two-day interval, conditions at the time were unfavorable but expected to become more conducive for development over subsequent days. As the disturbance tracked generally west-northwestward, a broad area of low pressure developed; the NHC increased the chances of formation accordingly. Convection – shower and thunderstorm activity – became steadily concentrated around the low-level center and spiral banding became evident. Following organizational improvement on satellite and microwave images, the system became Tropical Depression Three-E at 12:00 UTC on June 23 while located about 500 mi (800 km) south of Manzanillo, Colima. Several hours later, the NHC stated that, "the largest negative factor is probably the size of the depression...which could keep it from rapidly intensifying." The depression did not become better organized initially, with meager central convection and a lack of well-defined cloud features; by early on June 24, however, shower and thunderstorm activity began forming over the center. Two Advanced Scatterometer (ASCAT) passes indicated several 39 to 43 mph (63 to 69 km/h) wind vectors, and the cyclone became Tropical Storm Cosme around 00:00 UTC on June 24. A small central dense overcast-like feature was observed at the time.

Tracking west-northwestward around the southwestern periphery of a mid-level ridge over central Mexico, Cosme became better organized on June 24. A large area of very cold cloud-tops developed over and just southeast of the center of the storm, and convective banding wrapping into the mass began to form, mainly in the north and east semicircles. Though the cloud pattern became elongated north to south during the pre-dawn hours of the following day, a rapid improvement of the inner core on microwave and the structure on satellite imagery became apparent. A timely AMSU pass indicated an eyewall nearly closed with an accompanying intensity estimate of 77 mph (124 km/h), and a transient eye became visible on early morning satellite images. As a result, the National Hurricane Center upgraded Cosme to a Category 1 hurricane on the Saffir–Simpson hurricane wind scale on June 25. Given the light wind shear, warm sea surface temperature, and moist air environment, the agency predicted further intensification for the following hours. Around 00:00 UTC on June 26, Cosme attained its peak intensity with maximum sustained winds of 85 mph (140 km/h) and a minimum barometric pressure of 980 mbar (hPa; 28.94 inHg). Thereafter, a decrease in sea surface temperatures caused convection on the west side of the circulation center began to erode significantly. Late on June 26, the system weakened to a tropical storm. The tropical storm wind radii expanded early the following day, but the inner core of Cosme, specifically the structure of the eye, began to degrade; the low-level circulation became decoupled with the upper-level circulation as well, and all thunderstorm activity dissipated. Reduced to a swirl of low to mid-level clouds, winds decreased below tropical storm-force and deep convection did not reform over the center. At approximately 12:00 UTC on June 27, Cosme degenerated into a remnant low pressure area while situated about 690 mi (1,110 km) west-southwest of Cabo San Lucas, Baja California Sur. The remnant low of Cosme continued northwestward for the next several days, before degenerating into an open trough on July 1 about 1,610 mi (2,590 km) east-southeast of the Hawaiian Islands.

== Preparations and impact ==
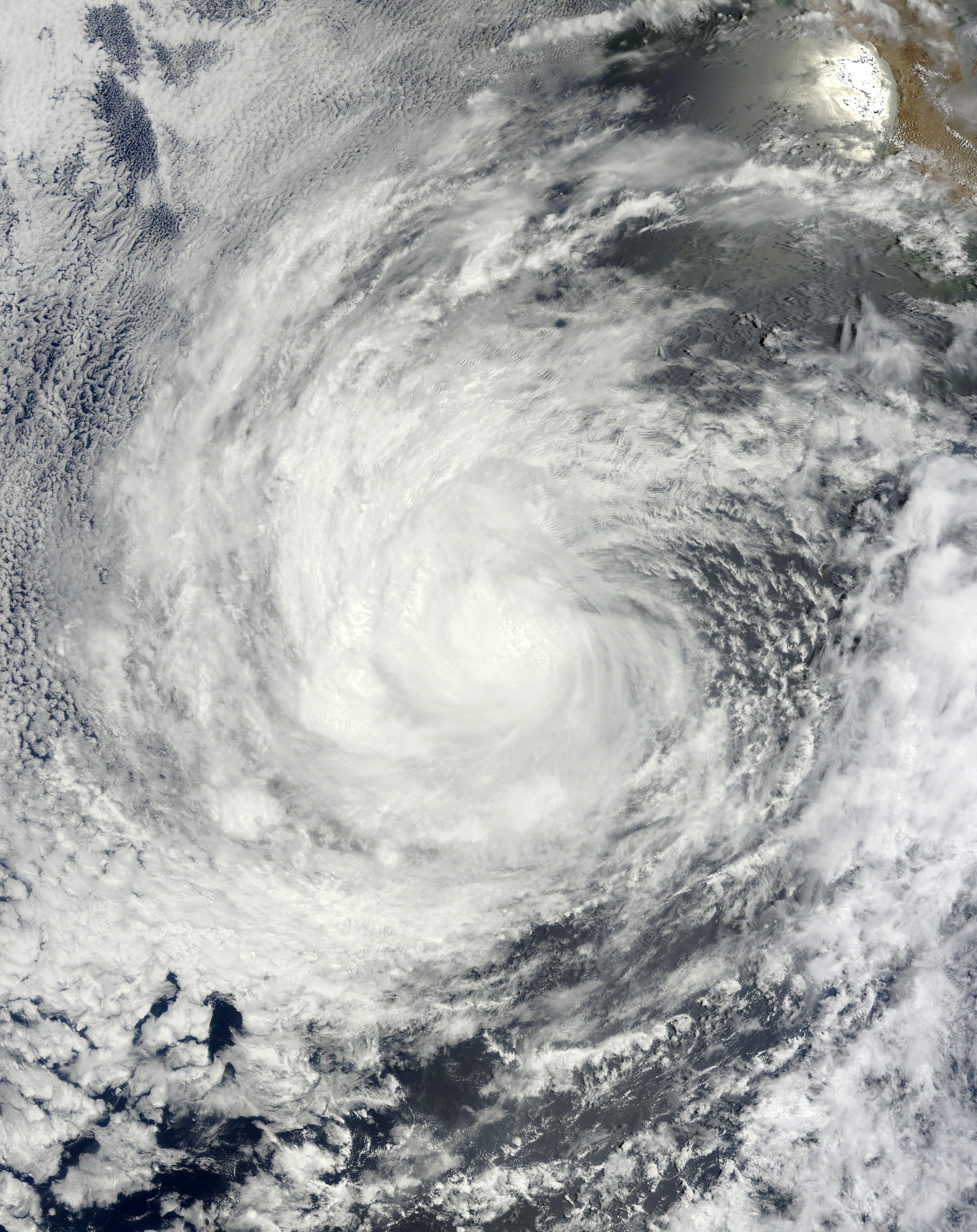
Tropical Storm Cosme weakening off the Mexican coast on June 26

Sistema Nacional de Protección Civil (SINAPROC) in Mexico issued various warnings regarding the storm on June 24 and June 25. Mexican authorities remained active throughout the disturbance and government officials began surveying and rebuilding damaged infrastructure as early as June 27. Multiple ports closed down small craft operation because of the weather. During the storm the port of Manzanillo and Mazatlan closed down for small craft operation. At least one death was caused when a tourist ignored these closures and was thrown overboard while operating a small boat during the storm.

When Cosme became a tropical storm on June 24, the Mexican National Weather Service (Servicio Meteorologico Nacional NWS) reported that it could produce heavy rains in the western area of the country. Rainfall as a result of the storm was predicted to range from "intense" to "heavy" in the states of Colima, Jalisco, Guerrero, Michoacan, and Oaxaca. The Mexican NWS also that "because of its wide circulation, [Cosme] generates significant potential for landslides and intense rain...waves 4 to 5 meters high and strong gusts of wind along the coast." Based on these forecasts the SINAPROC initially issued a green alert "low risk" hurricane warning within the states of Jalisco, Michoacan, and Colima, as well as a blue alert "minimum risk hurricane warning for the states of Nayarit and Guerrero. The continued strengthening of Cosme caused SINAPROC to issue a blue alert to Baja California Sur, stating that the system has strong potential to cause heavy rains despite its relatively long distance off shore.

Upon passing near the Revillagigedo Islands on June 25–26, Cosme generated large waves and strong winds. The Mexican Navy station on Socorro Island reported a gust of 46 mph (74 km/h).

Hurricane Cosme caused minor, but widespread, damage on mainland Mexico. Unstable structures, such as those made of wood and coconut, suffered the most damage as a result of the storm. Flooding and multiple landslides also left damaged and caused road blockages. Heavy rains were reported in southwest and south central Mexico, particularly in Michoacan. High waves were reported along the coast from Cabo Corrientes, Jalisco, to Acapulco, Guerrero. In Guerrero, rain caused at least 24 landslides, blocking state highways in several locations. Precipitation as a result of the storm system also resulted in flooding in the port city of Acapulco. Storm flooding damaged 50 homes, mainly due to the overflown streams of the Tlapa River. In Colima, coastal flooding induced by a storm surge damaged 34 tourist facilities, according to the Secretary of State Economic Development. Most of these facilities were located in the municipalities of Tecomny and Armory.

Several injuries and three deaths were attributed to the storm, two of which occurred in Guerrero. The first was an auxiliary member of the Mexican Highway patrol whose vehicle collided with a truck on the Mexico City-Acapulco road during inclement weather. Four others were injured in the same accident. Another 19 injuries resulted from two similar accidents that were also attributed to weather caused by the hurricane. The second death associated with the storm occurred after a man was thrown overboard his boat by high waves and drowned. In the wake of the storm system, the body of a middle aged man was discovered on a beach in Cuyutlan, Colima. However, it is questionable whether or not he was killed as a result of the hurricane because his injuries indicate that he had been dead for several days.

== See also ==
- Other storms named Cosme
- Timeline of the 2013 Pacific hurricane season
- Hurricane Blas (2022)
