= Pilbara historical timeline =

This timeline is a selected list of events and locations of the development of the Pilbara region of Western Australia.

Date	Event	Location	Notes
c 46,000 BP	Evidence of human habitation in Juukan Gorge	Juukan Gorge	
c 40,000 BP	Estimated age of Dampier Indigenous Australian rock art	Murujuga	
1622	East India Company ship Tryall wrecked, some survivors reach Java	Tryal Rocks	
1628	Dutch ship Vianen ran aground but refloated and explored coast	near Barrow Island	
1818	Captain Phillip Parker King surveyed the coastline, naming the Intercourse Islands and Nickol Bay	Dampier	
1861	Francis Thomas Gregory and his party explore the Nickol Bay area, naming Port Walcott, the Hardey River, the De Grey River and the Fortescue River		
April 1863	Captain Peter Hedland discovers Mangrove Harbour (Port Hedland)	Port Hedland	
April/May 1863	Charles Nairn, at the behest of his brother-in-law, pastoralist and entrepreneur Walter Padbury, establishes the first sheep station in the region.	De Grey River.	
May 1863	Tien Tsin Harbor [sic] (known later as Cossack) is established	Tien Tsin Harbor [sic]	
September 1863	Sherlock Station selected by John Wellard	Sherlock Station	
1864	Mount Welcome Station established by John and Emma Withnell	Mount Welcome Station	
1864	Cooya Pooya Station established by Thomas Lockyer	Cooya Pooya	
1865	Pyramid Station established by the Richardson Brothers for the Portland Squatting Company	Pyramid Station	
1865 (November)	The first permanent government office in the region is established, headed by R. J. Sholl, Government Resident for the North District. Sholl has been relocated from the short-lived settlement at Camden Harbour [sic] (on the north coast of the Kimberley).	Mount Welcome/Harding River	
1866	On the recommendation of surveyor Charles Wedge and R.J. Sholl, the region's first townsite, named Roebourne, is gazetted, adjoining the government camp, Mt Welcome and the Harding River.	Roebourne	
1869	Pardoo Station established as an outstation of De Grey Station	Pardoo Station	
1872	Copper discovered west of Whim Creek	Whim Creek	
1872	Mundabullangana Station established by the MacKays	Mundabullangana	
1872	Chirritta Station established by Donald Norman McLeod.	Chirritta	
1878	Minderoo Station established by the Forrest brothers and Septimus Burt	Minderoo	
1878	Yarraloola Station established by the Woolhouses	Yarraloola	
1879	Croydon Station established by the Robinsons	Croydon Station	
1886	Yarrie Station established by Christopher Coppin	Yarrie Station	
1887	Gold discovered at Mallina, east of Whim Creek	Mallina Station	
1887	First tramway opened, 2’ gauge and horse drawn, between Cossack and Roebourne	Roebourne	
1890	Gold discovered in Coongan River bed	Marble Bar	
1891	Emu Creek Station established	Emu Creek Station	
1893	Marble Bar town site gazetted		
1893	Marronah Station established by J. H. Mansfield	Maroonah	
1894	Cyclone kills 45 people at sea	Port Hedland	
1896	Townsite of Port Hedland gazetted	Port Hedland	
1896	Warrawagine Station established.	Warrawagine	
1898	Cyclone causes £30,000 worth of damage to Cossack		
1899	Townsite of Nullagine gazetted	Nullagine	
1905	Mining starts at Wodgina mine site south of Port Hedland		
1906	Alfred Canning commences surveying Canning Stock Route		
1909	Townsite of Point Samson gazetted	Point Samson	
1910	Canning Stock route completed droving of first cattle commences		
July 1911	Railway opened connecting Port Hedland with Marble Bar	Marble Bar Railway	
1912	Sinking of passenger steamer SS Koombana with loss of 150 lives	off Port Hedland	
1924	Marble Bar records world record 160 days at or above 100 °F (37.8 °C)	Marble Bar	
1931	Indigenous girls Molly Craig, Daisy Kadibil and Gracie Fields escape Moore River Native Settlement and walk home to Jigalong along the rabbit-proof fence	Jigalong	
1937	Asbestos mined at Yampire Gorge, near Wittenoom	Wittenoom	
1938	Government surveyors, Finucane and Telford, surveyed Mount Goldsworthy and reported the iron content of the ore at 65.66% with estimated reserves of more than 6,000,000 tons		
1946	The Pilbara Strike takes place		
1950	Townsite of Wittenoom gazetted	Wittenoom	
October 1952	Operation Hurricane British nuclear test	Montebello Islands	
November 1952	Lang Hancock flies over the Pilbara region, discovering vast iron ore deposits	Turner River	
1956	Operation Mosaic British nuclear tests	Montebello Islands	
December 1960	Australian Government changes restrictions on iron ore exports	Australia wide	
March 1961	Western Australian government announces that iron ore exploration permits will be allowed	Western Australia	
September 1962	CRA geologists identify Mount Tom Price deposits	Mount Tom Price	
1964	Oil was discovered in commercial quantities by West Australian Petroleum Pty Ltd	Barrow Island	
January 1965	Dampier and Mount Tom Price - construction commences at locations		
February 1965	Construction commences on the town of Goldsworthy	Goldsworthy	
June 1965	Dampier - Tom Price railway works commence	Hamersley Iron	
1966	Asbestos mine closed at Wittenoom Gorge	Wittenoom	
1966	Rio Tinto opens its first iron ore mine in the Pilbara	Mount Tom Price mine	
July 1966	Tom Price to Dampier - first fully loaded ore train		
August 1966	Dampier - first shipment of ore loaded		
1967	Iron ore discovered at Mount Whaleback	Newman	
May 1967	Hamersley Holdings Limited shares on the Australian Securities Exchange		
1968	BHP establishes an iron ore mine near Newman	Mount Whaleback	
1968	Plane crash kills 26	Indee Station, near Port Hedland	
August 1969	Development of community at Karratha begins		
July 1970	East Intercourse Island connected by causeway		
1971	Townsite of Wickham gazetted	Wickham	
1972	Cape Lambert port opened	Cape Lambert	
1972	Townsite of Newman gazetted	Newman	
1972	Townsite of Paraburdoo gazetted	Paraburdoo	
1972	Townsite of Pannawonica gazetted	Pannawonica	
1972	Dampier Salt commences operations	Dampier	
1974	North West Coastal Highway from Geraldton to Port Hedland completely sealed		
1975	Veevers Meteorite Crater discovered	Great Sandy Desert	
December 1975	Cyclone Joan - flooding in Pilbara and damages Hamersley Rail		
October 1977	Tom Price, Paraburdoo, Dampier and Karratha combined population passes 15,000		
1978	Meekatharra to Newman section of Great Northern Highway upgraded.	Great Northern Highway	
1981	WAPET discovers gas off the Pilbara coast with the drilling of the Gorgon 1 well	Gorgon gas project	
1983	Death of John Pat in police custody sparks calls for reform of police treatment of indigenous suspects	Roebourne	
1984	North Rankin A Gas Platform commissioned	North West Shelf	
1984	Pintupi Nine, the second-to-last Aboriginal group still living as nomadic hunter-gatherers, found (the last being the Richters family)	Lake Mackay	
1989	Newman to Port Hedland section of Great Northern Highway upgraded	Great Northern Highway	
1989	BHP opens iron ore mine near Newman	Jimblebar mine	
January 1990	Rio Tinto Group opens iron ore mine in Hamersley Range	Channar mine	
1991	Port Hedland Immigration Reception and Processing Centre opened	Port Hedland	
1992	Rio Tinto opens another iron ore mine in Hamersley Range	Brockman 2 mine	
December 1993	BHP opens another iron ore mine near Shay Gap	Yarrie mine	
1994	Rio Tinto opens another iron ore mine in Hamersley Range	Marandoo mine	
1995	Goodwyn A gas platform commissioned	North West Shelf	
1996	Doris Pilkington Garimara's book Follow the Rabbit-Proof Fence published	Brisbane	
2002	Widespread flooding from Cyclone Chris	Western Pilbara	
2003	Riots at Port Hedland Immigration Detention Centre	Port Hedland	
2004	Rio Tinto opens another iron ore mine in Hamersley Range	Eastern Range mine	
2006	Indee Gold Mine opens at Mallina, east of Whim Creek and is closed in 2008	Mallina	
2007	Rio Tinto opens another iron ore mine in Hamersley Range	Hope Downs mine	
March 2007	Wittenoom townsite officially abolished by gazettal	Wittenoom	
July 2007	Hickman Meteorite Crater discovered in search of Google Earth	Ophthalmia Range	
October 2007	Fortescue Metals Group begins mining iron ore in the Chichester Range	Cloud Break mine	
April 2008	First train runs on Fortescue railway	Fortescue railway	
June 2009	Fortescue Metals Group opens new iron ore mine in the Chichester Range	Christmas Creek mine	
September 2010	Rio Tinto opens another iron ore mine in Hamersley Range	Brockman 4 mine	
2013	Flooding from Cyclone Rusty	Port Hedland, De Grey Station	
2014	Death of Ms Dhu in police custody	South Hedland	
2018	Runaway ore train deliberately derailed after travelling 90 km	Turner Siding	
2020	Ancient rock shelters in Juukan Gorge blown up by Rio Tinto	Juukan Gorge	
2020	Ngururrpa Indigenous Protected Area declared	Great Sandy Desert	

== See also ==
- Kimberley historical timeline
- Regions of Western Australia
