= Rosemary Island =

Island in Dampier Archipelago of Western Australia

- Location within Western Australia

Geography
- Location: Indian Ocean
- Coordinates: 20°28′46″S 116°35′40″E
- Archipelago: Dampier

Administration
- Australia
- Electoral Division: Division of Durack
- State electorate: Pilbara
- LGA: City of Karratha

Demographics
- Population: 0
- Ethnic groups: Yaburara, Ngarluma

Additional information
- Time zone: AWST (UTC+8)

Rosemary Island is an island in the Dampier Archipelago in the Pilbara region of Western Australia. With Enderby Island it forms Class A Nature Reserve 36915, part of a proposed national park.

During World War II an airstrip was established at the north end of the island, where there is also a vehicle track and a well with a distinctive date palm. The well was constructed of concrete with a corrugated steel liner and is now filled with 20th century debris.

In 1699 the English navigator William Dampier, in command of the 26-gun warship HMS Roebuck on a mission to explore the coast of New Holland, following the Dutch route to the Indies, passed between Dirk Hartog Island and the Western Australian mainland into what he called Shark's Bay. He then followed the coast northeast, on 21 August 1699 reaching the Dampier Archipelago, which he explored, naming Rosemary Island on 22 August. He continued to Lagrange Bay, just south of what is now Roebuck Bay, before sailing for Timor.

In 2016, archaeologists from the University of Western Australia (UWA) excavated ancient rock shelters on Rosemary Island, between 8000 and 9000 years old. They may be the earliest known domestic structures in Australia.

In 2017, UWA archaeologists identified engravings left by crews of American whaling ships in the 1850s on Rosemary Island and West Lewis Island. In some cases the engravings were made over the top of ancient Aboriginal rock art.

Volunteers have been monitoring the hawksbill sea turtle, a critically endangered species, on the island since 1986. In November 2020, a 60-year old turtle, first tagged in November 1990 and again in 2011, returned to the same location.
