= Mardie Station =

Pastoral lease in Western Australia

Coordinates: 21°11′20.30″S 115°58′45.14″E

Location in Western Australia

Mardie Station is a pastoral lease and sheep then cattle station, that was established in 1866 in the Pilbara region of Western Australia, near the mouth of the Fortescue River. Mardie operates under the Crown Lease number CL453-1984 and has the Land Act number LA3114/1027. In 2012, the lessee was the Fourseasons Corporation.

== History ==
The original pastoral lease was taken up by Simpson and MacIntoch, who worked for the Denison Plains Pastoral Company. The company equipped the barque Warrier in Melbourne and had intended to sail to Roebuck Bay to settle in another area but, following a succession of calms, the ship had to land at Cossack, after the stock started to die of dehydration.

Upon landing, the group decided to trek south-west and eventually squatted at Mardie Springs. By 1883, three paddocks were fenced, several wells had been dug, and the flock numbered about 18,000 head of sheep.

The Murray Squatting Company, composed of Cornish, Richardson and the Paterson brothers, sold Yeeda Station in the Kimberley in 1883 and acquired Mardie shortly afterwards, paying a "handsome price for the Fortescue River Station". Richardson maintained an interest in Mardie over the next 30 years and invested in other nearby properties, including Oakabella, Tallering and Boodarie Stations.

The station was owned at one time by members of the Withnell family, who had also established or owned many other stations in the North West including Sherlock, Mount Welcome, Mallina, Karratha, Chirritta and Edjudina.

The station covers an area of about 225,000 hectares (560,000 acres) and has over 8,000 head of specially bred cattle.

The station was hard hit by flooding in 1894 when the Fortescue River, usually about 10 miles (16 km) away from the homestead, rose to within metres of the front door. The stockyards were destroyed and hundreds of sheep were washed away.

In 1913, James Withnell, the owner of Dirk Hartog Station, acquired Mardie from the Mardie Pastoral Company. At that time, the property occupied an area of 397,500 acres (160,863 ha) and was carrying a flock of 19,000 sheep.

In 1923, Withnell sold the station to B. H. Sharpe, who owned Wooleen Station, along with 30,000 head of sheep and 100 cattle, for £50,000.

The station switched from sheep to cattle in 1998. CITIC Pacific, a Hong Kong–based company, bought the station in 2007.

The station is home to the largest infestation of mesquite in the state, following the introduction of two trees as shade trees around the homestead and shearing shed in the 1930s. It is estimated that around 150,000 hectares (370,000 acres) are affected by the weed, and about 30,000 hectares (74,000 acres) of the infestation is described as dense. To prevent the infestation from spreading further, stock must be quarantined in paddocks free of mesquite so the seeds can pass through their gut before they are moved on.

The station experienced heavy rains and flooding during Cyclone Monty in 2004, and again in 2009. Fences were swept away, roads were cut and cattle were stranded when 150 millimetres (6 in) of rain fell in a few hours.

The property is also home to one of the largest holes ever dug in the earth. Sino Iron, a Chinese iron producer, mined magnetite at Mardie and planned an open cut mine of 5.5 kilometres (3.4 mi) long, 3 kilometres (1.9 mi) wide and hundreds of metres deep. The company has a 25-year lease, obtained in a deal with billionaire Clive Palmer.

== Climate ==
The station has a hot arid climate (Köppen BWh) with sweltering summers and very warm to hot winters. Average maximum temperatures range from 27.8 °C (82.0 °F) in July to 37.9 °C (100.2 °F) in January. Rainfall is generally low but highly variable; 364.0 millimetres (14.33 in) of rain fell in the 24 hours to 9:00AM on 10 February 1995, but only 8.7 millimetres (0.34 in) fell in the whole of 1936.

On 19 February 1998, Mardie recorded a maximum temperature of 50.5 °C (122.9 °F), which was the highest-ever reached in Western Australia, the highest February temperature recorded in Australia, and the second-highest temperature recorded anywhere in Australia. This temperature was recorded during a heatwave that affected the Pilbara region in February 1998, which also saw several other centres, such as Roebourne, record temperatures above 49 °C or 120.2 °F.

Mardie was the site of the highest temperature ever recorded in Western Australia until 13 January 2022, when the temperature in Onslow reached 50.7 °C (123.3 °F). Mardie recorded 50.5 °C (122.9 °F) again on the same day, equalling its own temperature record.

On 19 February 1975, during Cyclone Trixie, the station recorded several wind gusts of at least 259 kilometres per hour (161 mph), the highest wind gust recorded in Australia at that time. That figure was the maximum the anemometer could record, so the gusts may have been higher than that.

Climate data for Mardie
Month	Jan	Feb	Mar	Apr	May	Jun	Jul	Aug	Sep	Oct	Nov	Dec	Year
Record high °C (°F)	50.5 (122.9)	50.5 (122.9)	47.2 (117.0)	43.7 (110.7)	40.5 (104.9)	35.4 (95.7)	34.5 (94.1)	39.0 (102.2)	41.0 (105.8)	46.0 (114.8)	47.0 (116.6)	48.8 (119.8)	50.5 (122.9)
Mean daily maximum °C (°F)	37.9 (100.2)	37.4 (99.3)	37.6 (99.7)	35.9 (96.6)	31.5 (88.7)	28.2 (82.8)	27.8 (82.0)	29.6 (85.3)	32.3 (90.1)	35.0 (95.0)	36.4 (97.5)	37.6 (99.7)	33.9 (93.0)
Mean daily minimum °C (°F)	25.1 (77.2)	25.4 (77.7)	24.3 (75.7)	21.2 (70.2)	17.0 (62.6)	14.0 (57.2)	11.9 (53.4)	12.5 (54.5)	14.5 (58.1)	17.6 (63.7)	20.2 (68.4)	23.1 (73.6)	18.9 (66.0)
Record low °C (°F)	16.1 (61.0)	17.3 (63.1)	13.3 (55.9)	10.0 (50.0)	7.8 (46.0)	3.9 (39.0)	2.9 (37.2)	4.4 (39.9)	6.0 (42.8)	7.6 (45.7)	12.8 (55.0)	14.8 (58.6)	2.9 (37.2)
Average rainfall mm (inches)	37.9 (1.49)	62.6 (2.46)	48.9 (1.93)	19.3 (0.76)	36.5 (1.44)	37.1 (1.46)	13.8 (0.54)	7.0 (0.28)	1.3 (0.05)	0.8 (0.03)	1.4 (0.06)	9.3 (0.37)	275.9 (10.87)
Average rainy days (≥ 0.2 mm)	3.1	4.2	3.1	1.4	2.8	3.1	1.7	1.0	0.2	0.2	0.3	0.9	22
Source 1: Bureau of Meteorology
Source 2: The Guardian

== See also ==
- List of ranches and stations
- List of extreme temperatures in Australia
