= Port Walcott =

- Town
- Coordinates: 20°39′S 117°12′E
- Country: Australia
- State: Western Australia
- Location: 38 km (24 mi) from Karratha
- Established: 1960s

Government
  - State electorate: North West
  - Federal division: Durack
- Mean max temp: 31.9 °C (89.4 °F)
- Mean min temp: 20.1 °C (68.2 °F)
- Annual rainfall: 295.0 mm (11.61 in)

Port Walcott, formerly known as Tien Tsin Harbour, is a large open water harbour located on the northwest coast of Western Australia, located near the town of Point Samson.

== History ==
Before the port was established, the land was inhabited by the Ngarluma, an Aboriginal people.

Early European exploration of northwest Western Australia commenced around the Nickol Bay and Port Walcott areas, as colonial settlers established pastoral and pearling industries in the late-19th century. Early shipping links to the outside world centred on the port of Cossack (formerly Tien Tsin), now a ghost town.

In 1818, the explorer and surveyor Captain Phillip Parker King, in the Mermaid, charted Nickol Bay. Visits to the region by American whalers are recorded to have occurred from around the 1840–50s. In April 1861, a government-funded expedition sailed to Nickol Bay in the Dolphin, while in 1862, Bateman (of John and Walter Bateman) sent his vessel Flying Foam to harvest pearl shell in the area.

In April 1863 Captain Peter Hedland on the Mystery came upon Mangrove Harbour (later renamed Port Hedland) and Tien Tsin Harbour (later named Port Walcott). In August the same year the Tien Tsin arrived, which together with Mystery carried settlers and stock to the port, and established the first European settlement in the northwest, on the banks of the Harding River, inland from Tien Tsin Harbour.

The Norwegian-owned iron barque Solveig carrying jarrah piles for the Point Samson jetty was anchored in Port Walcott when it was wrecked during a cyclone in 1907 The Department of Maritime Archaeology lists 14 such shipwrecks in the vicinity, lost between 1868 and 1970.

== Geography ==
Port Walcott lies between Dampier and Port Hedland at the mouth of the Harding River. Landmarks within it include Cape Lambert, Wickham, Jarman Island, Butchers Inlet and the historical town of Cossack (initially called Tien Tsin), the first port in the northwest of Western Australia. The town of Roebourne is situated further inland on the banks of the Harding River.

Port Walcott's main population centre is Point Samson, which has a population of 298 (2011 census).

Port Walcott receives an annual rainfall of about 295 mm (11.6 in).

Local magnetic anomalies are reported northward of Cape Lambert, in the approaches to Port Walcott.

== Port facilities ==
Port Walcott contains the port facilities of Cape Lambert, which along with the neighbouring ports at Port Hedland and Dampier, are the three major iron ore exporting ports in the Pilbara region, and in the top five ports in Australia by tonnage (81 million tonnes in 2010/11).

== Ship ==
The bulk carrier Hanjin Port Walcott, built in 2012 by Hanjin Shipping and sold to JP Morgan in 2017, now known as HL Port Walcott, was named after Port Walcott.
