= Municipality of Cossack =

Former local government area in Western Australia

The Municipality of Cossack was a local government area in Western Australia, centred on the town of Cossack.

It was established on 1 December 1887. The council consisted of seven members with a chairman elected by the members. The first election was held on 20 December 1887, with A. W. Anderson becoming the first chairman. Meetings were held in the Cossack Assembly Room until council chambers were established by the mid-1890s.

In March 1888, the Daily News in Perth reported of the municipality: "Our Cossack Municipality has at last shaped itself into something like a body, but as yet they have had no meeting beyond that required for swearing in the members." A town clerk was appointed on 15 March 1888, and municipal by-laws were advertised in July. The municipality gained responsibility for the Cossack Commonage Reserve in June 1889.

The municipality faced some issues due to the town's remoteness, with reports in January 1891 that the municipality was unable to meet strict legislative requirements for taking action against rate defaulters due to the lack of a steamer service capable of conveying messages to Perth in the required timeframe. It was involved in lobbying for the establishment of basic services, including a post office, police station and jail, well into the 1890s.

It ceased to exist on 12 August 1910, when both the Cossack municipality and the nearby Municipality of Roebourne were dissolved and merged into the Roebourne Road District, which surrounded the town. The Northern Times wrote of the merger that the expanded road district was "likely to be more highly regarded and to do better work than three inferior ones whose scope for usefulness was circumscribed in several ways", while The Sunday Times said of the Cossack municipality that "it certainly did not do much good during the latter part of its existence and should have gracefully passed itself out some time ago".
