= Mount Welcome Station =

Pastoral lease in Western Australia

Coordinates: 20.75°S 117.12°E

Location in Western Australia

Mount Welcome Station is a pastoral lease that once operated as a sheep station but is now operated as a cattle station in Western Australia.

The property was founded at the foot of Mount Welcome by John and Emma Withnell on the banks of the Harding River next to a freshwater pool called leramargadu. The site is where the town of Roebourne is now located.

The Withnell family comprised John, pregnant Emma, their children George and John, Emma's sister and brother Fanny and John Hancock, John's brother Robert and three servants. The group had intended to settle at Port Walcott but their ship, Sea Ripple, ran aground at Port Hedland. It was later refloated and continued to Port Walcott, landing at Tien Tsin Harbour in April 1864. Only 86 sheep were saved of the 460 aboard. The family walked to the Harding River and settled at Mount Welcome.

A homestead for the 30,000-acre (12,141 ha) property was quickly constructed, a single room house made from stone, mud bats and the remains of their cargo with a spinifex roof. The homestead was a hub for the local community, which had a population of 200 by 1865, as it served as a link between the port of Cossack and the outlying runs.

Following a drought in 1870 the homestead was destroyed by a cyclone in 1872 and a large number of stock were killed. In 1878, new buildings were destroyed by fire and the Withnells sold the property in 1879 to Robert John Sholl and moved to Sherlock Station.

Sholl left the property under the management of his sons and in 1882 another cyclone struck, resulting in the loss of 160 sheep from the property.

The property was acquired by the Stove brothers at some time prior to 1914. The Stoves also owned Cooya Pooya, Karratha and Cherritta stations, which, along with Mount Welcome, sustained significant damage during a cyclone in 1925.

Mount Welcome House, situated on Hampton Road in Roebourne, was constructed by the Stoves in 1937. It is a single storey, timber framed, corrugated iron building with barrel vaulted roofs and was built on the same site as the original homestead. When it was completed Arthur and Percy Stove moved in while Tom Stove remained in the Weerina residence that had been built by the Sholls.

The Stove family still owned the property in 1952.

Mount Welcome House was heritage listed in 1998.

The state government threatened to forfeit the lease held by the Ieramugadu group, an Indigenous organisation, in 2006 after the property had been inspected and found to have been over-stocked, had poor fencing and inadequate watering points. By 2007 the problems were rectified and rent was paid, so the group was permitted to keep the lease-holding.

In 2009 up to 20 Aboriginal squatters were to be evicted from the heritage listed homestead and have their pet dogs destroyed after the building was condemned that had existed in Roebourne since 1864. The homestead is known to the local Aborigines as Munda Miya.

The Ngarluma Aboriginal Corporation is responsible for overseeing and managing Mount Welcome Station. The property occupies 20,000 hectares (49,421 acres) throughout Ngarluma country. Dave Rutherford was appointed by the corporation to manage the property in 2014 and bring it back into a productive cattle station. Rutherford also reintroduced sheep to the property by introducing Dorper sheep for meat production and also to provide training for people in the Ngarluma Community.

== See also ==
- List of pastoral leases in Western Australia
