= Cape Lambert =

Port in Western Australia

- Interactive map of Cape Lambert
- Location within Australia
- Native name: Port Walcott

Location
- Country: Australia
- Location: City of Karratha, Western Australia
- Coordinates: 20°35′34″S 117°10′50″E
- UN/LOCODE: AUCLT (Cape Lambert); AUPWL (Port Walcott)

Details
- Opened: 1972
- Operated by: Pilbara Iron
- Owned by: Rio Tinto Group
- No. of berths: 8
- Draft depth: 22.0 m.

Cape Lambert
- Town
- Country: Australia
- State: Western Australia
- Location: 38 km (24 mi) from Karratha
- Established: 1880s

Government
  - State electorate: North West
  - Federal division: Durack
- Postcode: 6720
- Mean max temp: 31.9 °C (89.4 °F)
- Mean min temp: 20.1 °C (68.2 °F)
- Annual rainfall: 295.0 mm (11.61 in)

Cape Lambert is a port facility operated by Rio Tinto Iron Ore in the Pilbara region of Western Australia. It is located 40 kilometres north-east of Karratha.

While the names of Cape Lambert and Port Walcott are often used interchangeably, the official name of the port is Port Walcott and the iron ore loading facility within is referred to as "Cape Lambert wharf". In shipping documents, it is often referred to as Port Walcott.

== Overview ==
Cape Lambert is one of the sea ports for exporting iron ore from Rio Tinto's mining operations in the Pilbara. (The other port is Dampier.) Ore is carried to the two ports on the Hamersley & Robe River railway.

Cape Lambert is East of Karratha (59 km), West of Point Samson (11 km) and Port Hedland (220 km) and due North of Wickham (10 km), Roebourne (22 km) and Millstream National Park (108 km).

== Point Samson beach ==
Linking the facility at Cape Lambert with the small holiday town of Point Samson is a long white beach. The white beach stretches for over 1 km and is a vantage point to observe queued iron ore bulk tankers waiting to dock, turtles nesting in the sand, or whales migrating off the cape. Sunsets at the beach can be red.

== Boat Beach ==
Boat Beach is a very popular local swimming and fishing spot situated immediately west of the Port rail and processing facilities, but easiest accessed off Walcott Drive not far from the town of Wickham. Boat Beach offers swimming and fishing and a boat-launching ramp. It is home to the old Port Walcott Yacht Club.

== Port ==
Iron ore mines in the Pilbara region.

The port of Cape Lambert was opened in 1972 and is operated by Pilbara Iron on behalf of Rio Tinto. Employees at the Cape Lambert facilities live in the nearby town of Wickham.

The port has an annual capacity to handle 80 million tonnes of iron ore. In comparison, the port of Dampier can handle 140 million tonnes annually. The former is approximately 40% of Rio Tinto's annual iron ore production from the Pilbara, as of 2009. Individual ships at the port take between 24 and 36 hours to load. The wharf at Cape Lambert is 3 kilometres long, 30 metres high and one of the highest, longest and deepest wharves in Australia.

Rio Tinto expanded the port from a capacity of 55 million tonnes annually to 80 million tonnes at a cost of A$952 million. The port is scheduled to undergo a further expansion to be completed by 2012. The new expansion is scheduled to cost A$276 million. The expansion is part of a plan to raise Rio Tinto's annual production from the Pilbara from 220 to 330 million tonnes annually by 2016. To achieve this, the Cape Lambert port capacity will be expanded to handle an additional 100 million tonnes annually.

The wharf at Cape Lambert stretches for 2.7 km, built to a minimum of 17.87metres above the water. It is the tallest in Australia. The wharf holds or shares every Australian bulk handling records.

The iron ore cargo loading facility is operated by Robe River Mining Company (owned by the Rio Tinto Group). The terminals at Port Walcott (Cape Lambert), East Intercourse Island and Parker Point (at Dampier) are together operated by the Department of Transport.

The port itself is an open water port and the Cape Lambert wharf is exposed to strong cross currents due up to over 5 metres of tidal movement. Six RA Star 3200 tugs are used by the facility to assist vessels in berthing and unberthing operations.

The terminal consists of

- 8 berths
- 4 ship loaders
- 5 car dumpers
- 4 million tonnes of live stockpile capacity

This has been expanded in the recent years to a capacity of 80 mtpa

== Expansion projects ==
In 2010 Rio Tinto announced $US200 million (A$226.4 million) in funding to begin expanding its Cape Lambert port facilities as part of a wider expansion of its Pilbara iron ore operations. The port expansion will support increasing the export capacity of Rio's Pilbara operations to 330 million tonnes a year by 2016.

Rio also proposed an additional 1.8 km, four-berth jetty and wharf at Cape Lambert to increase its current annual capacity of 80 million tonnes by a further 100 million tonnes. The expansion will be staged, rising to 225 million tonnes a year by the first quarter of 2011, 230 million tonnes by the second quarter of 2012, and 280 million tonnes by 2014.

=== Expansion management ===
Sinclair Knight Merz (SKM), has been appointed as the Engineering, Procurement and Construction Management contractor for the expansion of Rio Tinto's Cape Lambert port facility, including the delivery of a new greenfields iron ore port facility, Cape Lambert Port B, located alongside the existing Cape Lambert port.

=== New jetty and wharf ===
John Holland Group was awarded the $276 million deal for construction of the new 920 metre long Jetty and 420m long two-berth Ship-loading Wharf, and related works. Offshore piling started in mid-2011. The project was completed in 2012.

=== New tug harbour ===
Abigroup, in joint venture with indigenous contractor Geraldton Line Haul (GLH), has been awarded a $65 million contract by Rio Tinto for works at Cape Lambert.

The contract involves earthworks for the wharf abutment and tug harbour and the partial removal of the existing tug harbour breakwater. The construction of the wharf abutment and breakwater involved clearing, grubbing, topsoil stripping and surface soil stripping; excavate and remove existing materials extension of existing road crossing over the power station cooling water outlet. The construction of the tug boat harbour extension included the removal, temporary storage and reuse of tug boat harbour armour rock and core material and loading, hauling and placing the core material and rock armour.

=== Quarry operation ===
The Abigroup contract included quarry work involving the pioneering of the upper levels of the quarry by drill and blast and recovery of material for use in a crushing and screening operation. Operating quarry benches and daily drill and blast activities have been established to produce raw feed material and armour and the blasted material is sorted, loaded and hauled to either stockpiles or the crushing and screening operation.

== See also ==
- Pilbara Railways
