= Jiro Muramats =

Jiro Muramats (6 September 1878 – 7 January 1943) was a pearler who lived in Western Australia's remote town of Cossack.

Born in Kobe, Japan in 1878, he moved as a boy with his family to Western Australia's north-west where his father Sakutaro set up a business in 1891. Jiro attended the state school at Cossack, and from 1895 to 1897 boarded at Xavier College, Melbourne. The family business prospered, importing goods for the Japanese community of Cossack, and when their father died in 1898 (leaving an estate of £1,101) Jiro and his brother Tsunetaro took control of the family firm. They re-branded it J. & T. Muramats and under this title imported and traded goods to the north-west for more than 50 years. His brother moved back to Japan to operate the exporting side of the business from there, until his death in 1925.

In November 1904 he applied for a Gallon License for his residence in Perseverance Street in Cossack. This license was granted, but not after opposition on the grounds that he was a foreigner (despite being naturalised at this point) and also that there were already two other pubs in town.

On 17 January 1905 Jiro married Hatsu Noguchi (originally from Nagasaki) who had arrived in Australia in 1896. They had one daughter.

The company also owned pearling luggers, which operated from Cossack despite a number of racist policies of the state that prohibited "coloured aliens" from owning pearling licences. The pearling, combined with goods trading, and the supply of credit to many other firms, meant that by 1915 a large proportion of the freehold land in Cossack belonged to the Muramats brothers.

A period of revitalisation in the pearling industry became one of defiance by a number of operators who did not join the federal government's voluntary Northern Territory Pearling Ordinance in 1931. Muramats had been granted naturalization in Victoria, Australia, but amendments to acts in Western Australia disenfranchised many people from non-English ethnic backgrounds.

He was the plaintiff in the High Court case, Jiro Muramats v Commonwealth Electoral Officer for Western Australia (32 CLR 500 [1923] HCA 41), in which he unsuccessfully challenged the refusal of the Commonwealth to enrol him as a voter, despite his being enrolled as a voter at the state level, due to Commonwealth law banning enrolment by "natives of Asia". However, the Commonwealth Electoral Act 1925 exempted citizens naturalised in Australia such as himself from that racial discrimination, without repealing it in general.

He was interned during World War II and died of cancer in 1943 whilst still locked up in Tatura Internment Camp.

His wife returned to Cossack in 1946, and was its last resident when the town was abandoned in the 1950s. She later returned to Japan, and died in Yokohama on 12 August 1959 (leaving an estate in Australia of £7,670).
