= Dampier, Western Australia =

Dampier
- Town
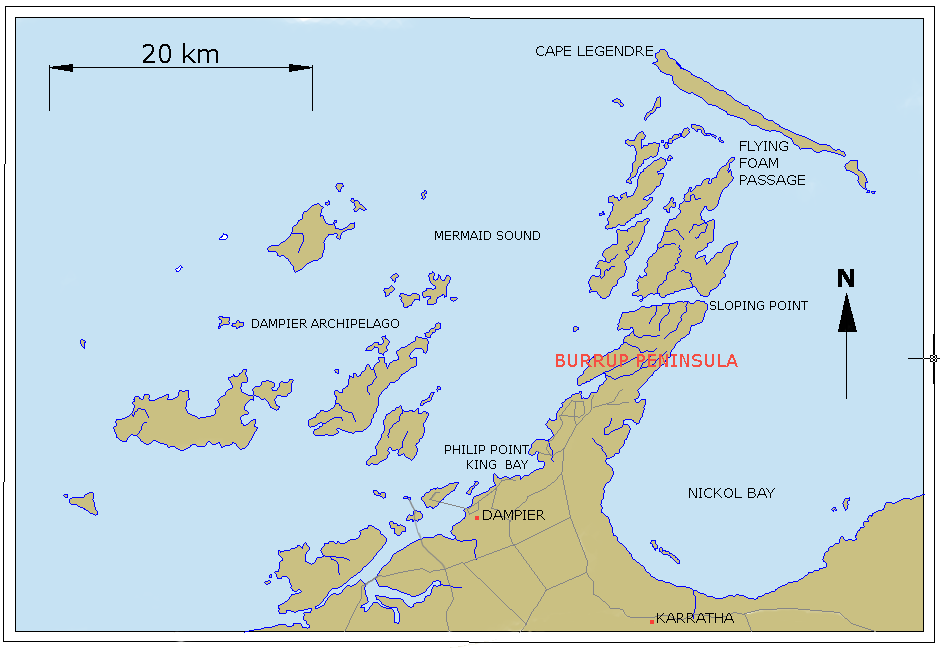
- Map of Dampier, Western Australia and surrounding area

- Interactive map of Dampier
- Coordinates: 20.66°S 116.71°E
- Country: Australia
- State: Western Australia
- LGA: City of Karratha
- Location: 19 km (12 mi) from Karratha; 1,562 km (971 mi) from Perth
- Established: 1965

Government
  - State electorate: Pilbara
  - Federal division: Durack

Area
  - Total: 10.5 km^{2} (4.1 sq mi)
- Elevation: 0 m (0 ft)

Population
  - Total: 1,282 (SAL 2021)
- Postcode: 6713
- Mean max temp: 30.6 °C (87.1 °F)
- Mean min temp: 22.7 °C (72.9 °F)
- Annual rainfall: 310.3 mm (12.22 in)

Dampier is a major industrial port in the Pilbara region in the northwest of Western Australia. It is located near the city of Karratha and Port Walcott.

Dampier Port is part of the Dampier Archipelago and is primarily a port for the export of iron ore from Rio Tinto mines, LNG and salt. The port services petrochemical, salt, iron ore and natural gas export industries. Rio Tinto exports large volumes of iron ore, especially Pilbara blend through the port, and in September 2010 announced plans to expand capacity. At the 2011 census, Dampier had a population of 1,341.

== History ==
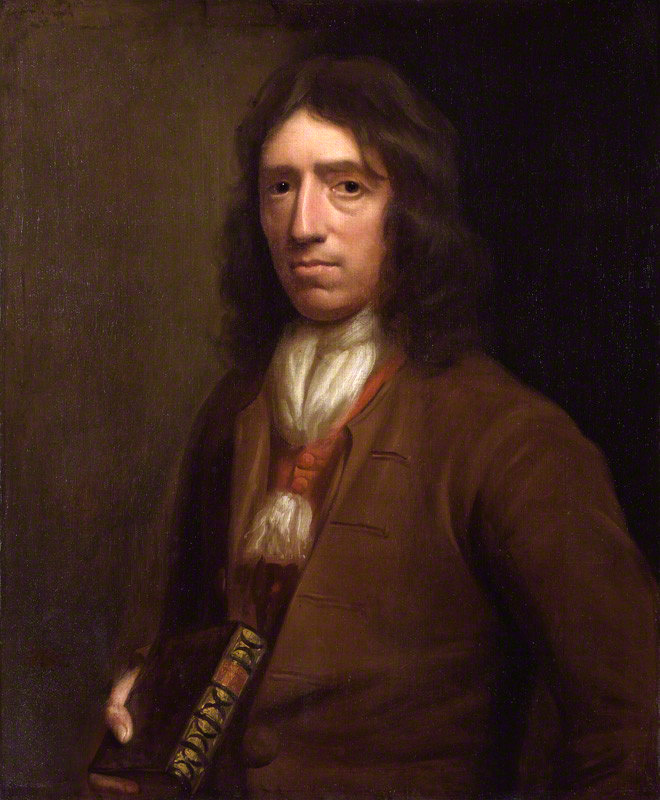
William Dampier

The Yaburrara Aboriginal tribe lived in the area for many thousands of years.

The town derives its name from its location on Dampier Island 3 km off the Pilbara Coast and part of the Dampier Archipelago, both named after the English navigator William Dampier. In 1963, the island became an artificial peninsula when it was connected to the mainland by a causeway for a road and railway. In 1979, Dampier Peninsula was renamed after Mt Burrup, the highest peak on the island, which had been named after Henry Burrup, a Union Bank clerk murdered in 1885 at Roebourne.

In 1699, Dampier, in command of the 26-gun warship HMS Roebuck on a mission to explore the coast of New Holland, following the Dutch route to the Indies, passed between Dirk Hartog Island and the Western Australian mainland into what he called Shark Bay. He then followed the coast northeast, on 21 August 1699, reaching the Dampier Archipelago, which he explored, naming Rosemary Island. He continued to Lagrange Bay, just south of what is now Roebuck Bay, before sailing for Timor.

The town was built from 1965 onwards, to serve the railway transporting iron ore from Tom Price and Paraburdoo. By 1968, the further expansion of Dampier had been constrained by geographical factors, and a new town of Karratha was established on the mainland as a result.

== Environment ==
The Burrup Peninsula, or Murujuga, which means "Hip Bone Sticking Out" in the Yaburrara language, is home to what is believed to be the largest collection of petroglyphs (ancient rock art) in the world.

There are 42 other islands in the Dampier Archipelago. There is a hugely diverse marine ecosystem around the islands, including whales, dugongs, turtles, coral, and sponges. Green turtles, (Chelonia mydas) are known to nest in the Dampier Archipelago.

== Climate ==
Under the Köppen climate classification, Dampier has a desert climate (BWh). The annual average rainfall is 272.2 millimetres (10.7 in), which would make it a semi-arid climate, except, like Alice Springs, its high evapotranspiration (or its aridity) makes it a desert climate. Dampier has extremely hot and humid summers with dewpoints exceeding 24 °C (75 °F). Having over 3,700 hours of annual sunshine, it is one of the sunniest places in Australia and the world; its sunshine hours approach those of Aswan in Egypt.

Climate data for Dampier Salt
Month	Jan	Feb	Mar	Apr	May	Jun	Jul	Aug	Sep	Oct	Nov	Dec	Year
Record high °C (°F)	46.4 (115.5)	47.1 (116.8)	45.7 (114.3)	42.2 (108.0)	39.5 (103.1)	32.5 (90.5)	33.0 (91.4)	37.3 (99.1)	38.7 (101.7)	43.2 (109.8)	45.5 (113.9)	46.5 (115.7)	47.1 (116.8)
Mean daily maximum °C (°F)	35.9 (96.6)	36.0 (96.8)	36.2 (97.2)	34.4 (93.9)	29.9 (85.8)	26.6 (79.9)	26.2 (79.2)	27.7 (81.9)	30.5 (86.9)	32.7 (90.9)	34.3 (93.7)	35.7 (96.3)	32.2 (90.0)
Mean daily minimum °C (°F)	26.1 (79.0)	26.5 (79.7)	25.5 (77.9)	22.8 (73.0)	18.2 (64.8)	15.1 (59.2)	13.4 (56.1)	14.6 (58.3)	16.8 (62.2)	19.7 (67.5)	22.2 (72.0)	24.6 (76.3)	20.5 (68.9)
Record low °C (°F)	17.5 (63.5)	20.1 (68.2)	20.0 (68.0)	15.8 (60.4)	10.4 (50.7)	5.2 (41.4)	4.6 (40.3)	6.4 (43.5)	8.6 (47.5)	9.0 (48.2)	11.4 (52.5)	15.9 (60.6)	4.6 (40.3)
Average precipitation mm (inches)	36.3 (1.43)	71.4 (2.81)	46.7 (1.84)	18.9 (0.74)	31.0 (1.22)	36.1 (1.42)	11.7 (0.46)	4.4 (0.17)	1.5 (0.06)	0.8 (0.03)	1.4 (0.06)	13.4 (0.53)	272.8 (10.74)
Average precipitation days	4.1	5.5	4.2	1.9	3.4	3.5	2.2	1.1	0.6	0.2	0.4	1.5	28.6
Average afternoon relative humidity (%)	50	51	44	37	38	40	35	35	32	37	41	45	40
Mean monthly sunshine hours	325.5	292.9	303.8	288.0	269.7	258.0	282.1	316.2	324.0	356.5	354.0	356.5	3,727.2

== Attractions ==
At the entrance to the town is a statue of "Red Dog", a red kelpie/cattledog well known for roaming the area in the 1970s and hitching rides to nearby towns. The statue reads "Erected by the many friends made during his travels". Other attractions include the fishing not far off the coast, the most commonly targeted species being barramundi (Lates calcarifer).

== Port ==
Iron ore mines in the Pilbara region

The port of Dampier was opened in 1966, when the first iron ore from the Mount Tom Price mine was transported via the Hamersley & Robe River railway to Parker Point and loaded on ships. The port at East Intercourse Island opened in 1972.

The port has an annual loading capacity of 140 million tonnes of iron ore. Rio Tinto's other iron ore port, Cape Lambert, can handle 80 million tonnes per year. It takes from 24 to 36 hours to load a ship at port. With the neighbouring ports of Port Hedland and Port Walcott, Dampier is one of three major iron ore exporting ports in the Pilbara region The closest airport to the port is Karratha, located less than 20 kilometres away.

== Photos ==
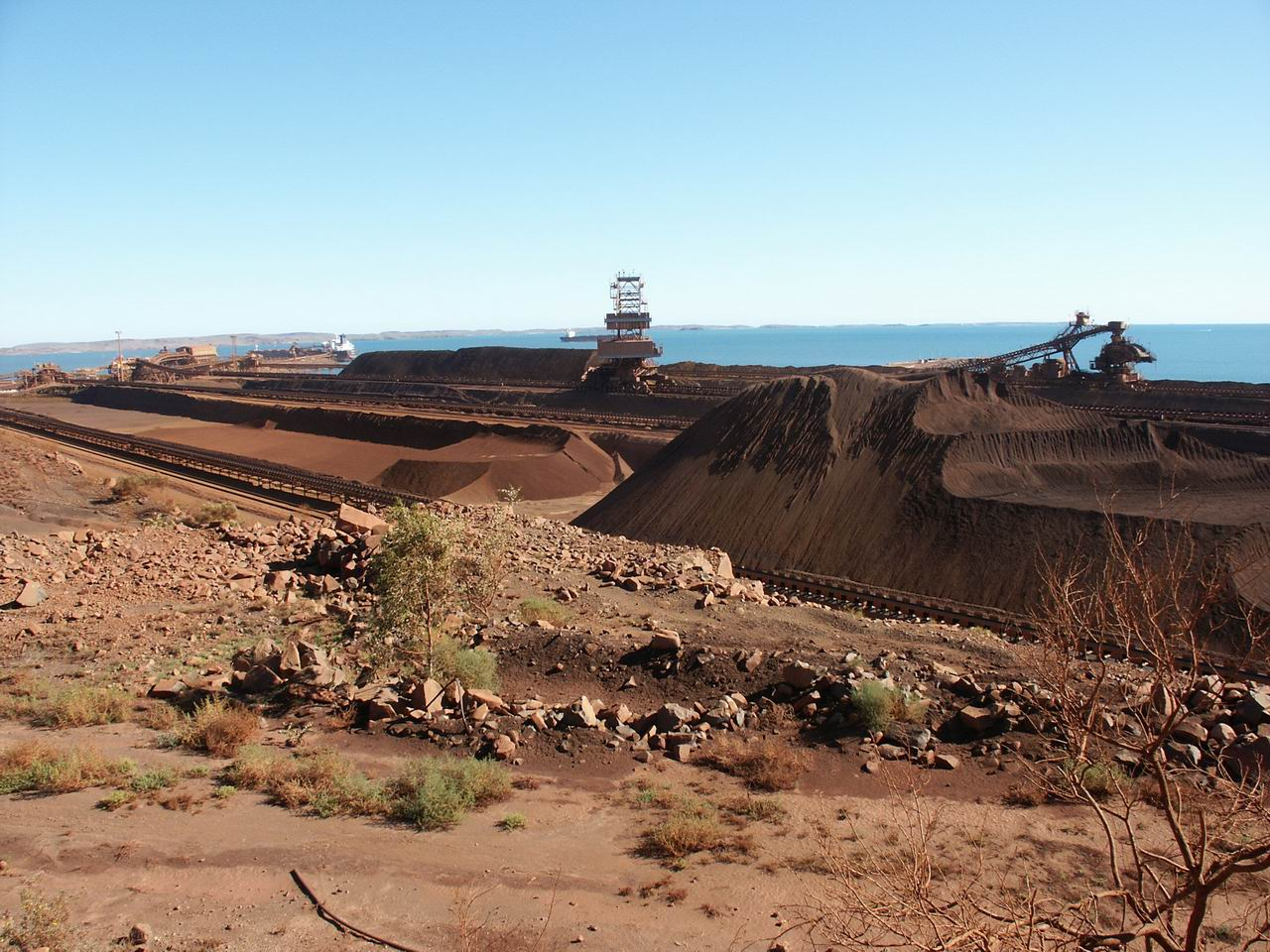
Iron Ore

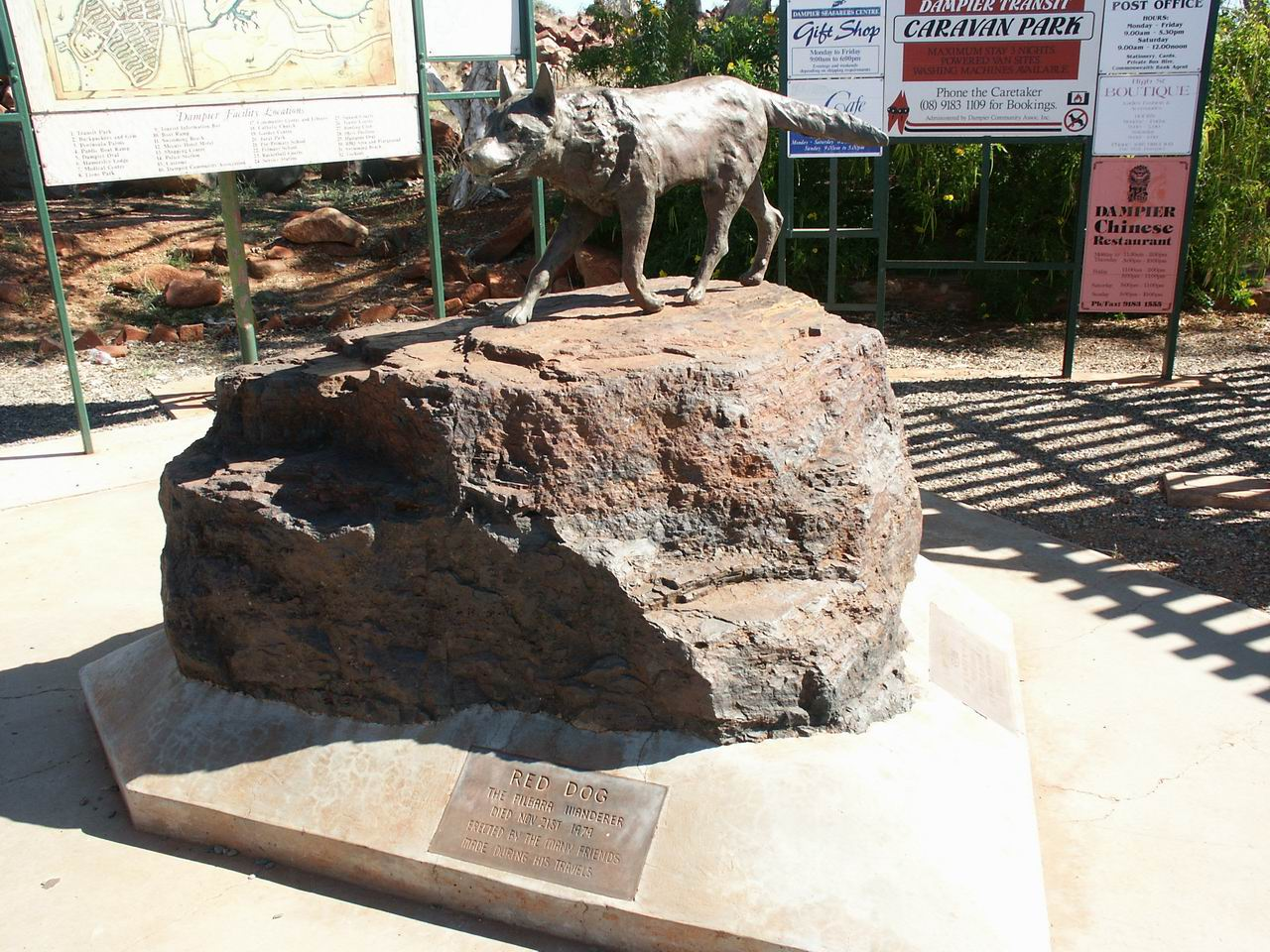
"Red Dog" statue

=== Panoramas ===
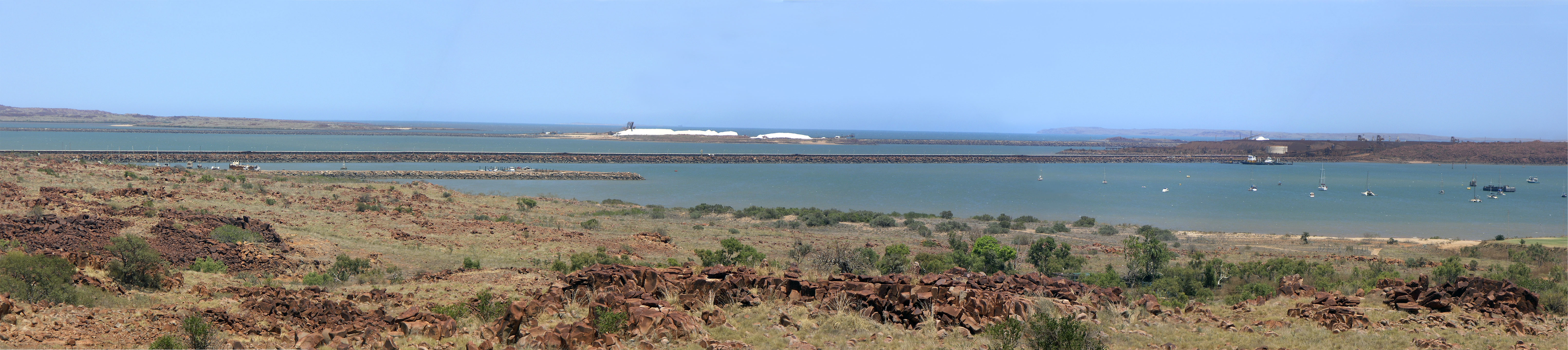
Dampier panorama, November 2006
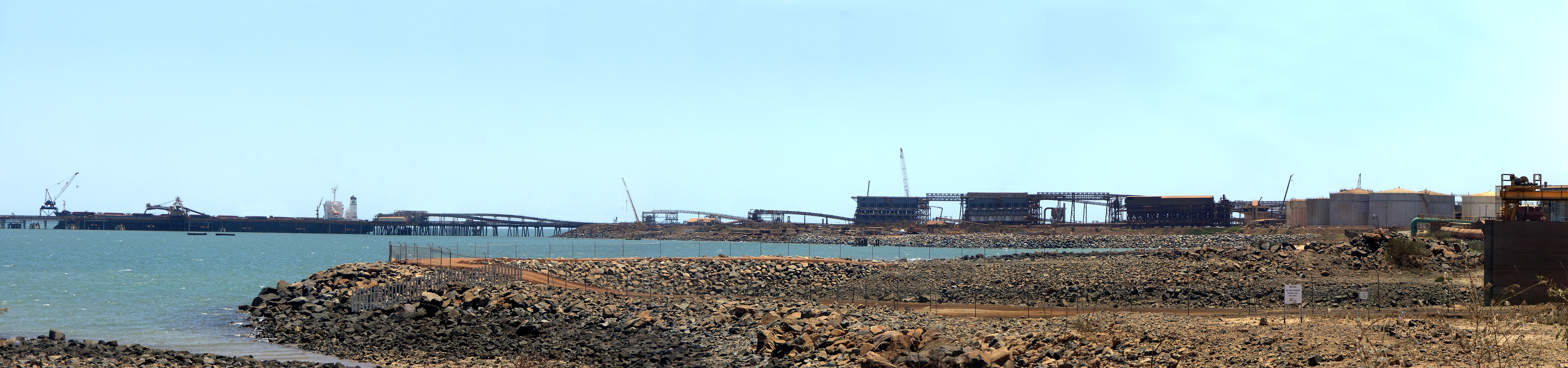
Dampier Port panorama, November 2006

== See also ==
- Pilbara historical timeline
- Red Dog Story
