= Cooya Pooya =

Pastoral lease in the Pilbara, Western Australia

Coordinates: 21.034°S 117.139°E

- Location within Western Australia

General information
- Type: Station
- Location: 29 kilometres (18 mi) south of Roebourne and 60 kilometres (37 mi) south east of Dampier, Pilbara, Western Australia

Western Australia Heritage Register
- Designated: 2 September 1998
- Reference no.: 3376

Cooya Pooya Station, most often referred to as Cooya Pooya or Cooyapooya, is a pastoral lease operating as a sheep station in Western Australia.

== Description ==
The property is situated approximately 29 kilometres (18 mi) south of Roebourne and 60 kilometres (37 mi) south east of Dampier along the banks of the Harding River in the Pilbara region of Western Australia. The country is composed of open grassy plains and underlying slopes covered with spinifex. The name of the station is a corruption of Cooa Pooey, the Aboriginal name of a water hole near the homestead.

== History ==
The first settlers in the area were the pastoralists W. A. Taylor and Thomas Lockyer, during the mid-1860s. Several years later, Taylor sold his interests and left the area, which had already become known as "Cooyapooyo", "Cooyapooya" and "Cooya Pooya".

Lockyer, who arrived from Northam, had originally named his lease "Table Hill Station". By 1885 Lockyer and his four sons had a flock of 28,000 sheep which were shorn to produce 220 bales of wool. The Lockyers acquired a run further inland on the Fortescue River which when combined with Table Hill had a total area of 900,000 acres (3,642 km^{2}) of which 150,000 acres (607 km^{2}) were enclosed in sheep proof fencing dividing it into eight paddocks. The merged station became known as "Cooya Pooya".

George Lockyer died at Cooya Pooya of pleurisy in 1893 at 49 years of age. He had arrived at the property in 1865 representing his father's pastoral syndicate. The Lockyer brothers had built up a large pastoral interest in the region; they also owned Mulga Downs and Portland Stations.

Following a drought the station was abandoned for a time in 1897, with all stock being removed to the tableland.

Samuel L. Burges owned Cooya Pooya in 1911 and also acquired neighbouring Springs Station in the same year. By 1912 the property was carrying a flock of 22,000 sheep and shearing produced 340 bales of wool. In 1915 the combined flock size between Cooya Pooya and Mulga Downs was 35,000 sheep. The manager, Mr G. R. Turner, left the property in the same year, after seven years in charge.

The Stove brothers acquired the station prior to 1925, adding it to their portfolio of property, which included Mount Welcome and Cherritta stations. The region was struck by a severe cyclone in early 1925, causing severe damage to Cooya Pooya and many other properties in the area.

By 1950, Percy Stove and his wife left the station to move south. Their son Jack Stove took over management of the property in their absence. The following year Stove was lucky not to be killed when a fire broke out in the storeroom, and a box of gelignite exploded. An estimated £200 worth of damage was caused to the storeroom, the roof of which blew off in the explosion.

The old homestead was placed on the state heritage list in 1998. The listing recognized the major role that the station played in the development of the pastoral industry in the region. The building is a single storey stone structure with an iron roof and detached kitchen.

== See also ==
- List of ranches and stations
- List of pastoral leases in Western Australia
