= City of Karratha =

Coordinates: 20°44′10″S 116°50′46″E

- Local government area
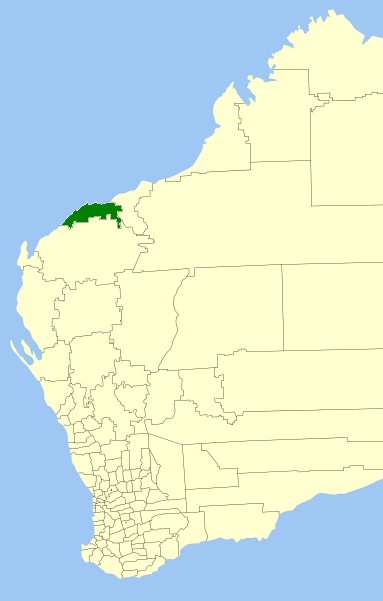
- Location in Western Australia

- Interactive map of City of Karratha
- Country: Australia
- State: Western Australia
- Region: Pilbara
- Established: 1910
- Council seat: Karratha

Government
  - Mayor: Daniel Scott
  - State electorate: Pilbara
  - Federal division: Durack

Area
  - Total: 15,235.8 km^{2} (5,882.6 sq mi)

Population
  - Total: 22,199 (LGA 2021)
- Website: City of Karratha
LGAs around City of Karratha
Indian Ocean	Indian Ocean	Port Hedland
Indian Ocean	City of Karratha	Port Hedland
Ashburton	Ashburton	Port Hedland

The City of Karratha is one of the four local government areas in the Pilbara region of Western Australia. It covers an area of 15,882 square kilometres (6,132 sq mi) and had a population of about 21,500 as at the 2016 census, most of which is located in its seat of government, the city of Karratha, and the major towns. It was formerly known as the Shire of Roebourne but was renamed and granted city status on 1 July 2014.

== History ==
The City of Karratha originated as the Roebourne Road District, established on 6 January 1887. The towns of Roebourne and Cossack were excised as separate municipalities on 1 December 1887, forming the Municipality of Roebourne and Municipality of Cossack. As the region's population declined, both municipalities were re-merged into the road district in 1910: Roebourne on 11 March and Cossack on 13 August.

On 1 July 1961, it became the Shire of Roebourne under the Local Government Act 1960. On 1 July 2014, it was granted city status and renamed the City of Karratha.

== Wards ==
The city is divided into eleven wards:

- Karratha (eight councillors)
- Dampier (one councillors)
- Wickham-Point Samson-Roebourne-Cossack-Pastoral (two councillors)

== Towns, suburbs and localities ==
The towns, suburbs and localities of the City of Karratha with population and size figures based on the most recent Australian census:

Locality	Population	Area	Map
Antonymyre	0 (SAL 2016)	60.6 km^{2} (23.4 sq mi)	
Balla Balla	8 (SAL 2021)	242.4 km^{2} (93.6 sq mi)	
Baynton	4,496 (SAL 2021)	2.8 km^{2} (1.1 sq mi)	
Bulgarra	2,990 (SAL 2021)	4.7 km^{2} (1.8 sq mi)	
Burrup	0 (SAL 2021)	114.6 km^{2} (44.2 sq mi)	
Cleaverville	8 (SAL 2021)	26.8 km^{2} (10.3 sq mi)	
Cooya Pooya	0 (SAL 2021)	174.9 km^{2} (67.5 sq mi)	
Cossack	14 (SAL 2021)	67.7 km^{2} (26.1 sq mi)	
Dampier	1,282 (SAL 2021)	10.5 km^{2} (4.1 sq mi)	
Dampier Archipelago	0 (SAL 2016)	2,936.9 km^{2} (1,133.9 sq mi)	
Gap Ridge	175 (SAL 2021)	66.9 km^{2} (25.8 sq mi)	
Gnoorea	5 (SAL 2021)	13.6 km^{2} (5.3 sq mi)	
Karratha City Centre	98 (SAL 2021)	0.5 km^{2} (0.19 sq mi)	
Karratha Industrial Estate	163 (SAL 2021)	11.8 km^{2} (4.6 sq mi)	
Maitland	12 (SAL 2021)	2,546.9 km^{2} (983.4 sq mi)	
Mardie	609 (SAL 2021)	3,890.3 km^{2} (1,502.1 sq mi)	
Millars Well	2,104 (SAL 2021)	3.4 km^{2} (1.3 sq mi)	
Mount Anketell	0 (SAL 2016)	254.8 km^{2} (98.4 sq mi)	
Mulataga	0 (SAL 2016)	15.4 km^{2} (5.9 sq mi)	
Nickol	4,938 (SAL 2021)	3 km^{2} (1.2 sq mi)	
Pegs Creek	2,050 (SAL 2021)	4.5 km^{2} (1.7 sq mi)	
Point Samson	249 (SAL 2021)	359.8 km^{2} (138.9 sq mi)	
Roebourne	975 (SAL 2021)	175.8 km^{2} (67.9 sq mi)	
Sherlock	0 (SAL 2021)	6,399.4 km^{2} (2,470.8 sq mi)	
Stove Hill	6 (SAL 2021)	32.7 km^{2} (12.6 sq mi)	
Whim Creek	5 (SAL 2021)	30.3 km^{2} (11.7 sq mi)	
Wickham	2,022 (SAL 2021)	24.1 km^{2} (9.3 sq mi)	

== Heritage-listed places ==
As of 2023, 122 places are heritage-listed in the City of Karratha, of which 30 are on the State Register of Heritage Places. Of those, 18 are located in Cossack and ten are in Roebourne; with the only two outside those two locations being the Cooya Pooya Station and the De Grey - Mullewa Stock Route.
