= Cossack, Western Australia =

Town in Australia

Cossack
- Town
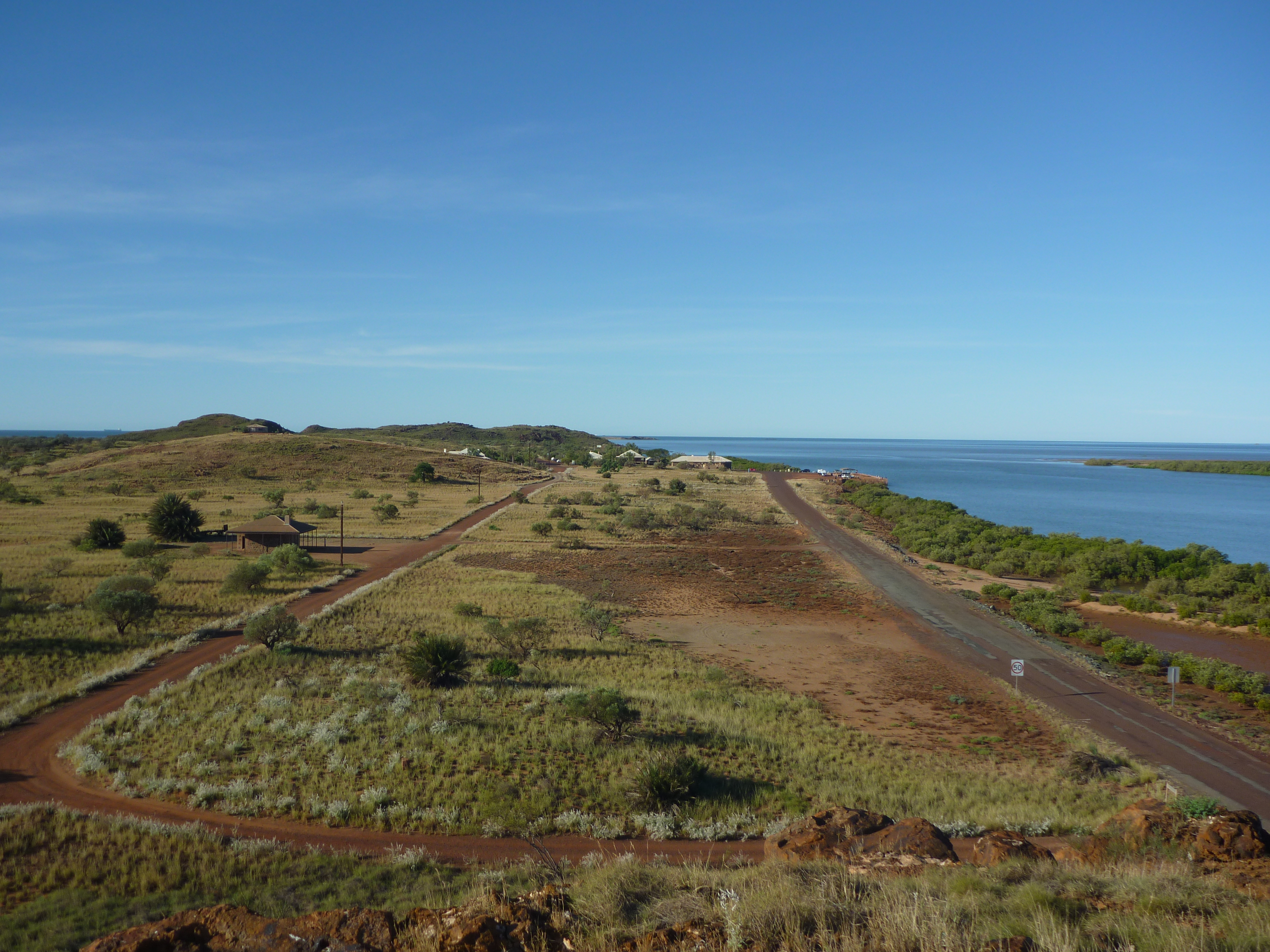
- The Cossack townsite, viewed from Nannygoat Hill

- Interactive map of Cossack
- Coordinates: 20.68°S 117.19°E
- Country: Australia
- State: Western Australia
- LGA: City of Karratha
- Location: 34 km (21 mi) from Karratha
- Established: 1863; 1871 (renamed)

Government
  - State electorate: North West Coastal
  - Federal division: Durack

Area
  - Total: 67.7 km^{2} (26.1 sq mi)
- Elevation: 7 m (23 ft)

Population
  - Total: 14 (SAL 2021)
- Postcode: 6720
- Mean max temp: 31.9 °C (89.4 °F)
- Mean min temp: 20.1 °C (68.2 °F)
- Annual rainfall: 295.0 mm (11.61 in)

Designations

Western Australia Heritage Register
- Designated: 21 April 2006
- Reference no.: 3239

Cossack, known as Bajinhurrba in Ngarluma language, and formerly known as Tien Tsin, is a historic ghost town located 1,480 km (920 mi) north of Perth and 15 km (9.3 mi) from Roebourne in the Pilbara region of Western Australia. The nearest town to Cossack, which is located on Butcher Inlet (also called Butcher's Inlet) at the mouth of the Harding River, is Wickham. The former Tien Tsin Harbour is now known as Port Walcott. Since 2021, the townsite is managed and operated by the Ngarluma and Yindjibarndi Foundation Ltd (NYFL).

The area is an important cultural site for the Ngarluma, the traditional owners, who have inhabited the area for tens of thousands of years. The river mouth remains an important location for fishing and hunting traditional foods. There are many ancient petroglyphs in the area.

Cossack is the birthplace of Western Australia's pearling industry and was the home of the colony's pearling fleet until the 1880s. The town was abandoned after the 1940s, leaving substantial stone buildings in a state of disrepair. Many of the buildings are listed by the National Trust, after the town was declared a museum town.

Cossack is a popular tourism destination given its proximity to the ocean, freshwater, and distance from the North West Coastal Highway. Tourists are able to camp at Cossack or stay in the historic buildings, by booking through the NYFL, which manages and operates the town site.

== History ==
Before the town was built, the land was inhabited by the Ngarluma, an Aboriginal people.

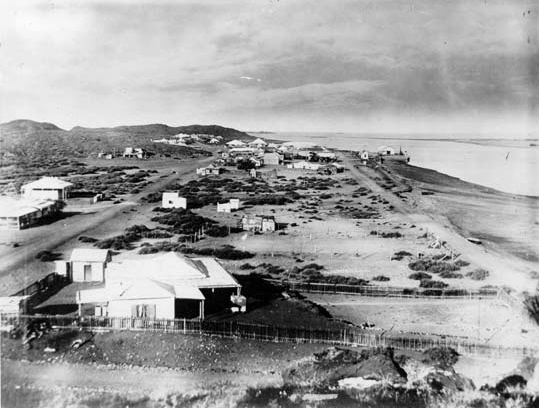
Cossack in 1898, from Nannygoat Hill

In May 1863, Walter Padbury landed his stock at the mouth of the Harding River near the present site of Cossack. Cossack was first known as Tien Tsin, after the barque that carried Padbury and his party. The ship that brought the state's governor, Frederick Weld, in December 1871 was named HMS Cossack, and the town adopted this name in 1872 (officially 1873). Cossack was the first port in the North West, and was critical to the development of the pastoral industry in the region.

In the 1880s numerous Chinese men were recruited from Singapore under contract to work as shepherds. Chin Ah Quan also ran a small store, purchasing goods from Singapore via coastal steamers such as the Natal.

The harbour serving the town, formerly known as Tien Tsin Harbour, was later renamed Port Walcott.

=== Pearling ===
In 1866 the town of Roebourne was declared, and the pearling industry began in the region. Cossack was the birthplace of Western Australia’s pearling industry and was the home of the colony’s pearling fleet until the 1880s. Many small boats off the Port Walcott coast dived for pearl shell during the 1860s using Aboriginal labour, including women and children. By early 1869, there were 14 small vessels pearling in the area, with an average crew of three Europeans and six Aboriginal people. By the early 1870s up to 80 luggers were operating in the area. The pearling industry also attracted a large Asian population. By 1895, there were 989 Malays and 493 Aboriginal people employed on 57 vessels at Cossack. The high number of Asians in the industry, including Japanese and Chinese as well as Malay, led to the establishment of an Asian quarter known as "Chinatown".

In 1881 a cyclone damaged the town, and every pearling vessel then operating either foundered or was beached. In 1885, 44 vessels were operating out of Cossack. In that year a parliamentary select committee recommended the closure of several pearling banks in the area due to depletion. In 1886, the main pearling industry moved to Broome.

In the 1920s there was still a Japanese shop in Cossack, run by pearling brothers Jiro and T. Muramats.

=== Causeway and tramway ===
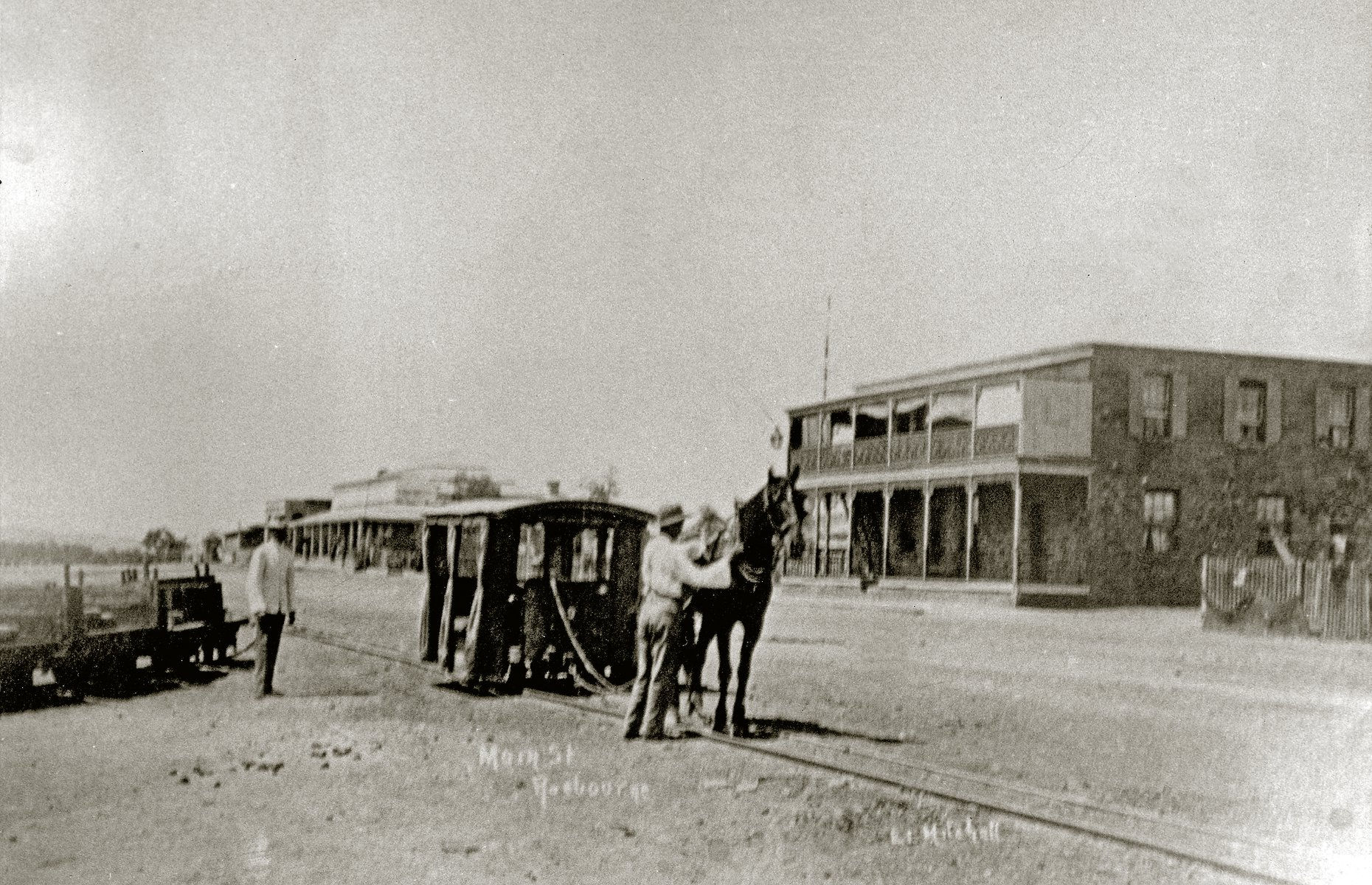
8.5 miles (13.7 km) long, 2 ft (610 mm) gauge Cossack-Roebourne horse-hauled tramway, photographed in 1909 at Roeburne

During the 1870s, a causeway was built across the tidal salt flats that separate Cossack from the main road. The causeway still forms the only access to the town from land.

A horse-drawn tramway between Roebourne and Cossack was completed in 1887, the same year that the municipality of Cossack was declared, and the north-west gold rush commenced.

=== Decline of the township ===
Following the move of the pearling industry to Broome and the decline of the gold rush, the population of Cossack dwindled. The harbour proved unsuitable for the larger ships of the early 20th century. Between 1902 and 1904, a jetty was constructed at the nearby hamlet of Point Samson. In 1910, the port moved there and the municipality of Cossack was dissolved.

Wool bales and pearls were loaded on to a lighter for transport to ships 3 mi (4.8 km) offshore which took the cargo to England. Inhabitants of the town in the early twentieth century included Greeks and other Europeans, Japanese, Malays, Timorese, Koepangers and Aru Islanders. The town was abandoned in the 1950s or 1940s.

The region is subject to violent storms and cyclones, and was severely damaged at different times in its history. Its use as a port for the profitable pearling industry and other economic booms saw investment and backing from Perth and it remained an important northern port. The town was abandoned after the 1940s, leaving substantial stone buildings in a state of disrepair. The state government established a survey, in 2007, into the potential for restoration or revitalisation of this remote town. Cossack is now a Museum Town.

=== Leprosarium ===
In 1913 a leprosarium was established on the other side of the river (Butcher's Inlet) known as the Lazarette, and gazetted as a quarantine reserve. It moved to Darwin in 1931 with its remaining 17 patients, with another 12 arriving in 1933. It was at a time when many Aboriginal people who were thought to have leprosy or other infectious diseases were sent to lock hospitals and leprosariums. Hundreds were sent to Cossack under the Aborigines Act 1905, under which the Chief Protector of Aborigines was able to arrest and send any Indigenous person suspected of having a range of diseases. They were often treated poorly, and they were cut off from their families. Non-Indigenous patients were not treated in the same way; Indigenous ones were forced to build their own huts, and also had to undertake manual work at the leprosarium building paths, while non-Indigenous ones were given decent accommodation.

== Location and geography ==
Cossack is located on Butcher Inlet (also known as Butcher's Inlet) at the mouth of the Harding River. It is reached by a single, sealed road that follows the original causeway across a series of tidal salt flats. The overall landform of the region around Cossack is a low, flat plain with occasional rocky hills and ranges. The vegetation is mainly grass, spinifex and low shrub, with occasional trees (mangroves) along watercourses and in gullies. The mangrove scrub becomes quite dense along the shoreline and at the mouth of the inlet.

The main road from Roebourne to Cossack continues past the town of Wickham and the Cape Lambert iron ore port (operated by Pilbara Iron), and terminates at the fishing town of Point Samson. The townsite is not visible from the main road, and only becomes apparent as the road rounds Nanny Goat Hill.

The site of the former town is defined by Nanny Goat Hill, Tien Tsin Lookout, the hilly ground to the north-east and north-west, and Butcher Inlet to the east and south-east. There are several beaches on small islands opposite Butcher Inlet. Past the townsite, the road winds up to the Reader Head Lookout, from which sweeping views of the surrounding coastline can be seen.

== Heritage buildings ==
The main stone buildings were constructed in the 1880s. Administrative and other public buildings built there in the 1890s continued a style adopted by the emerging state; these have been surveyed by state heritage groups and determined to be architecturally and historically significant.

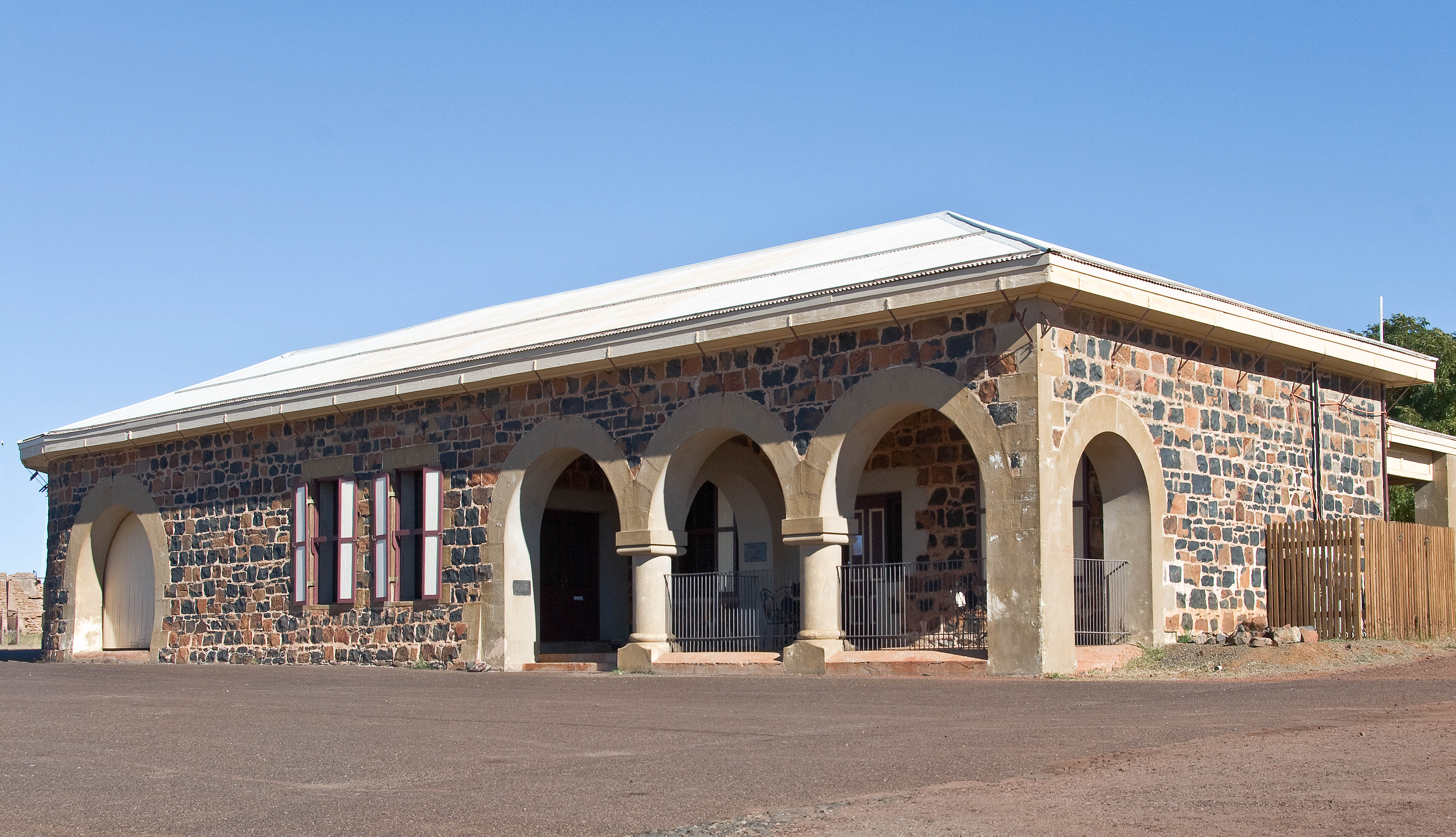
Customs House & Bond Store (now café)

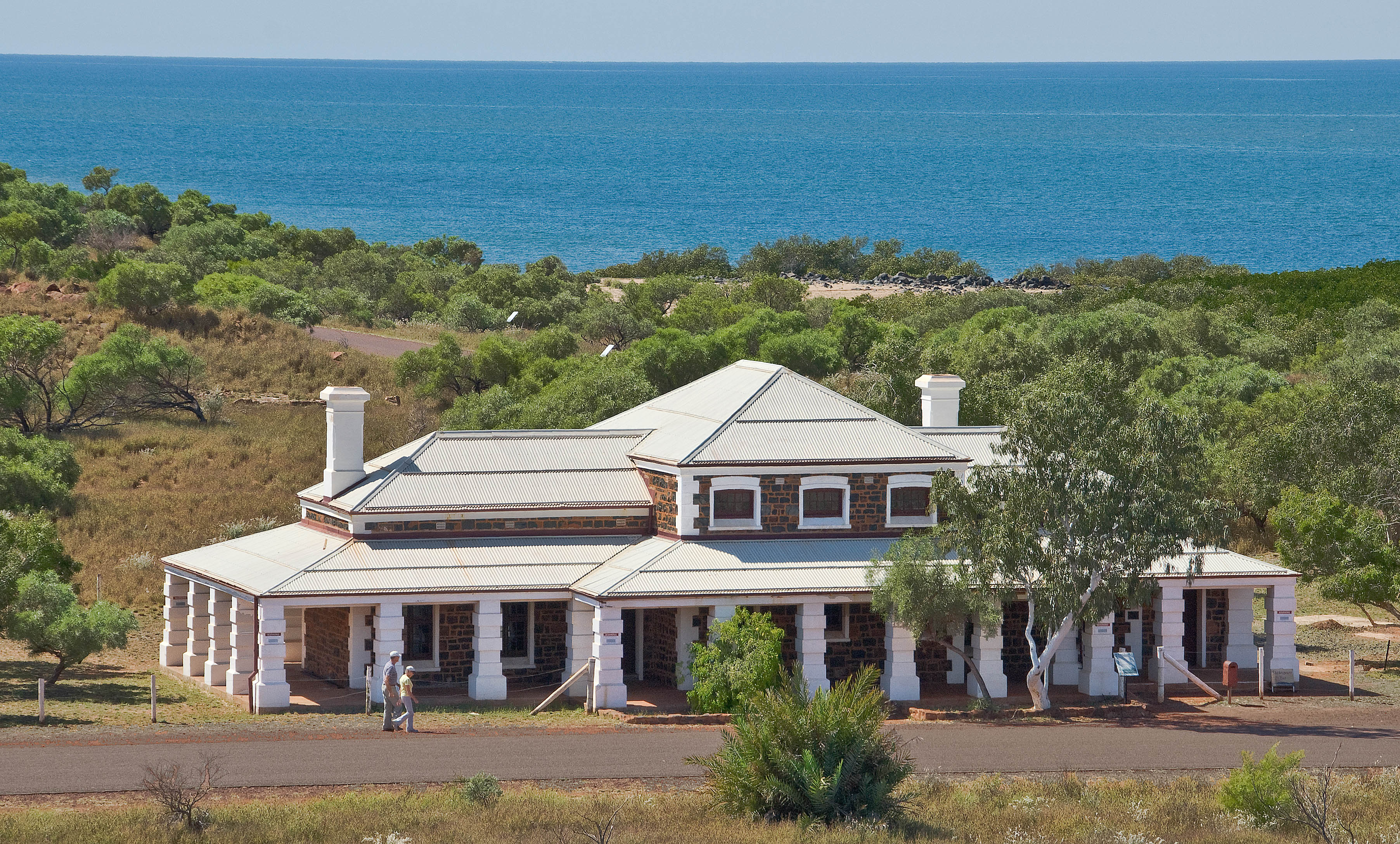
Courthouse (now museum)

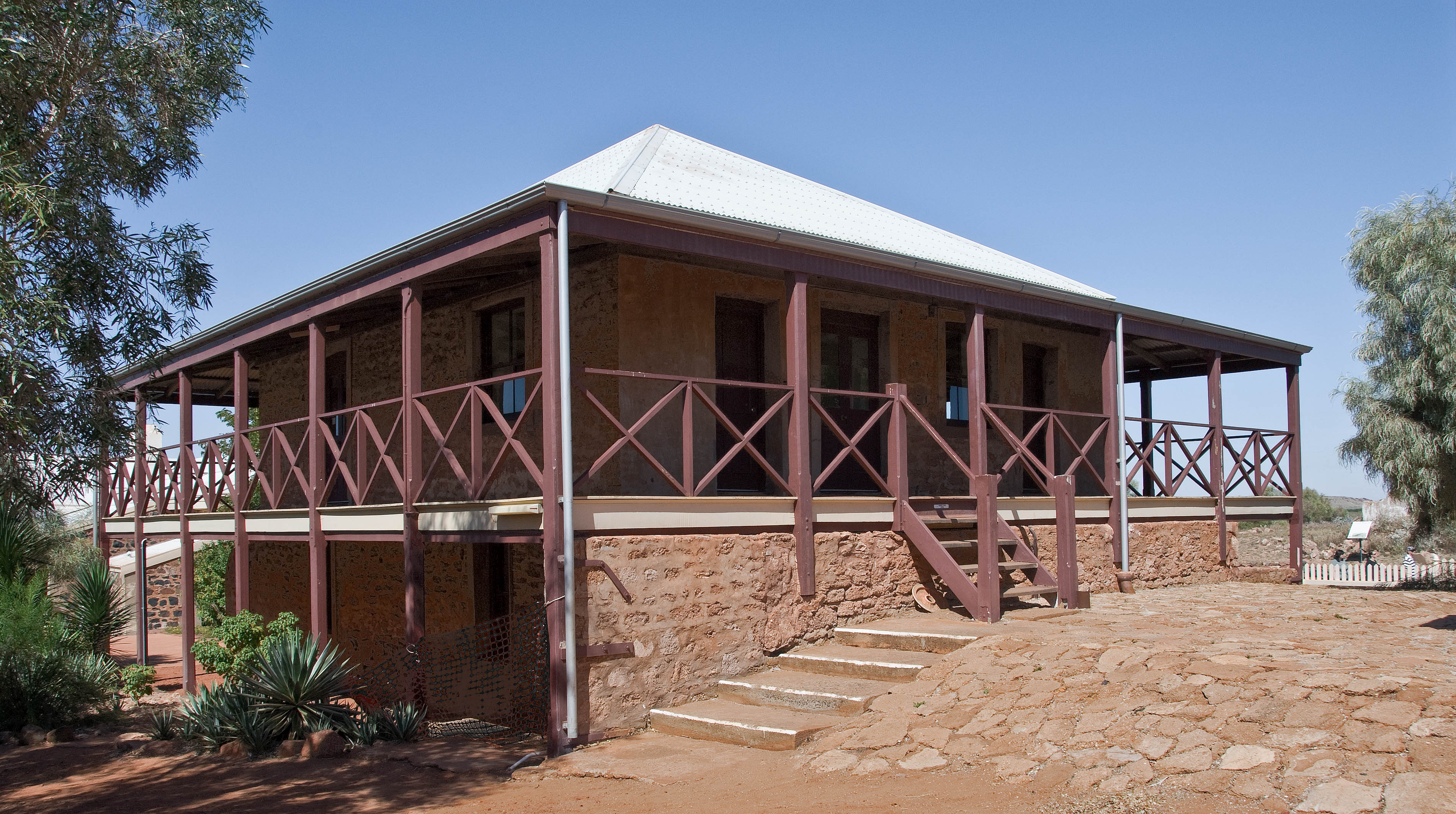
Post & Telegraph Office (now art gallery)

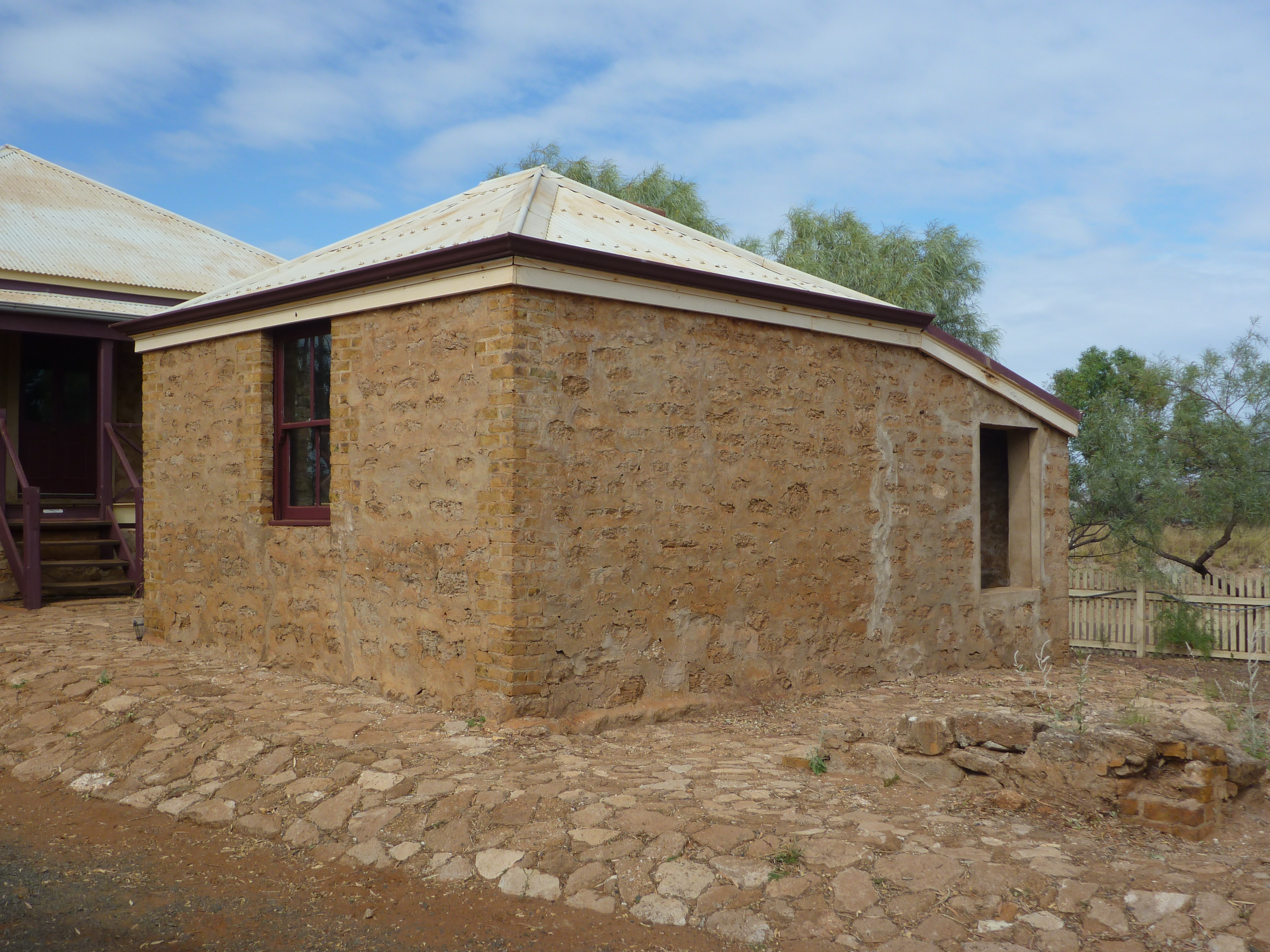
Bakehouse (1880s)

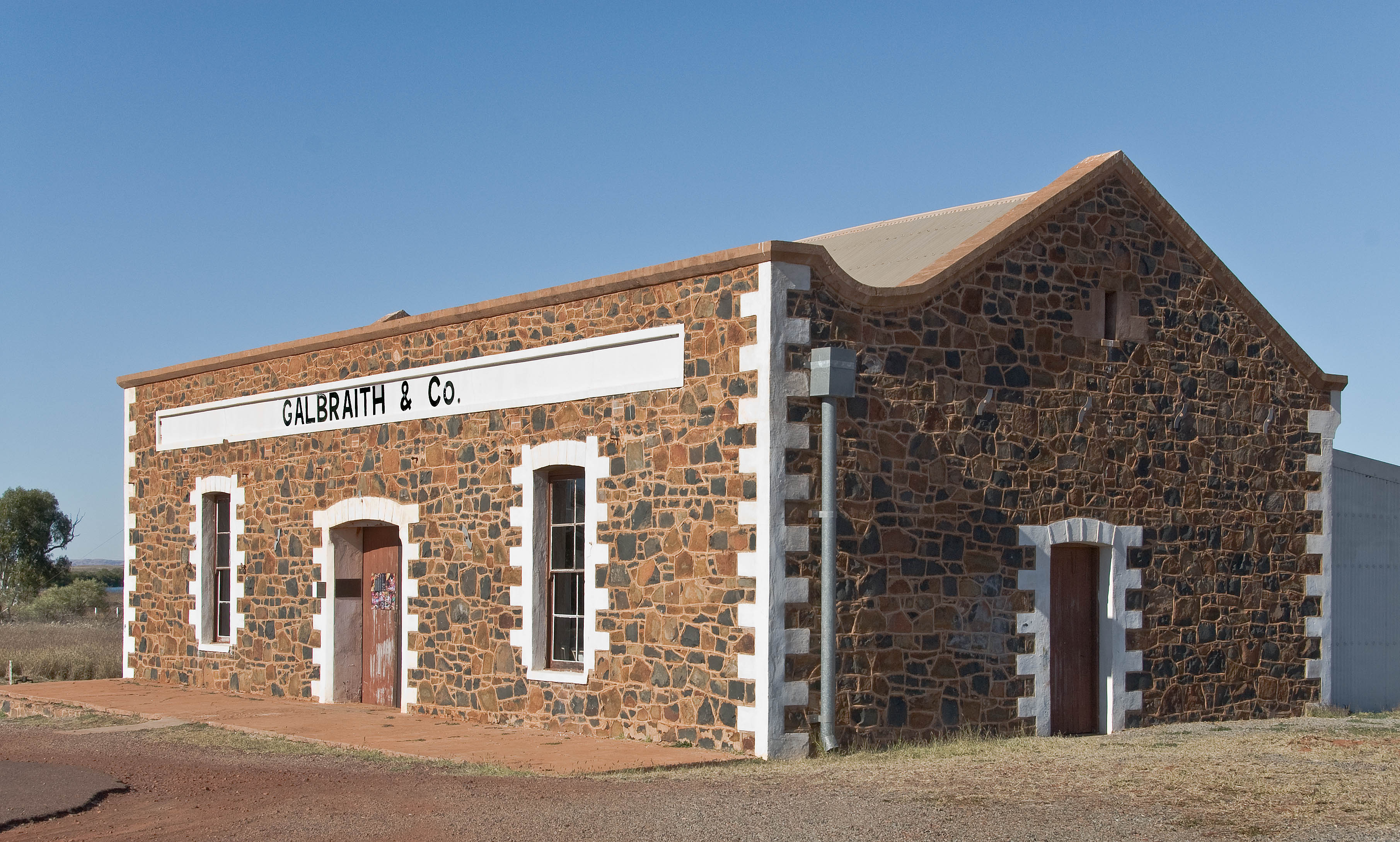
Galbraith's Store

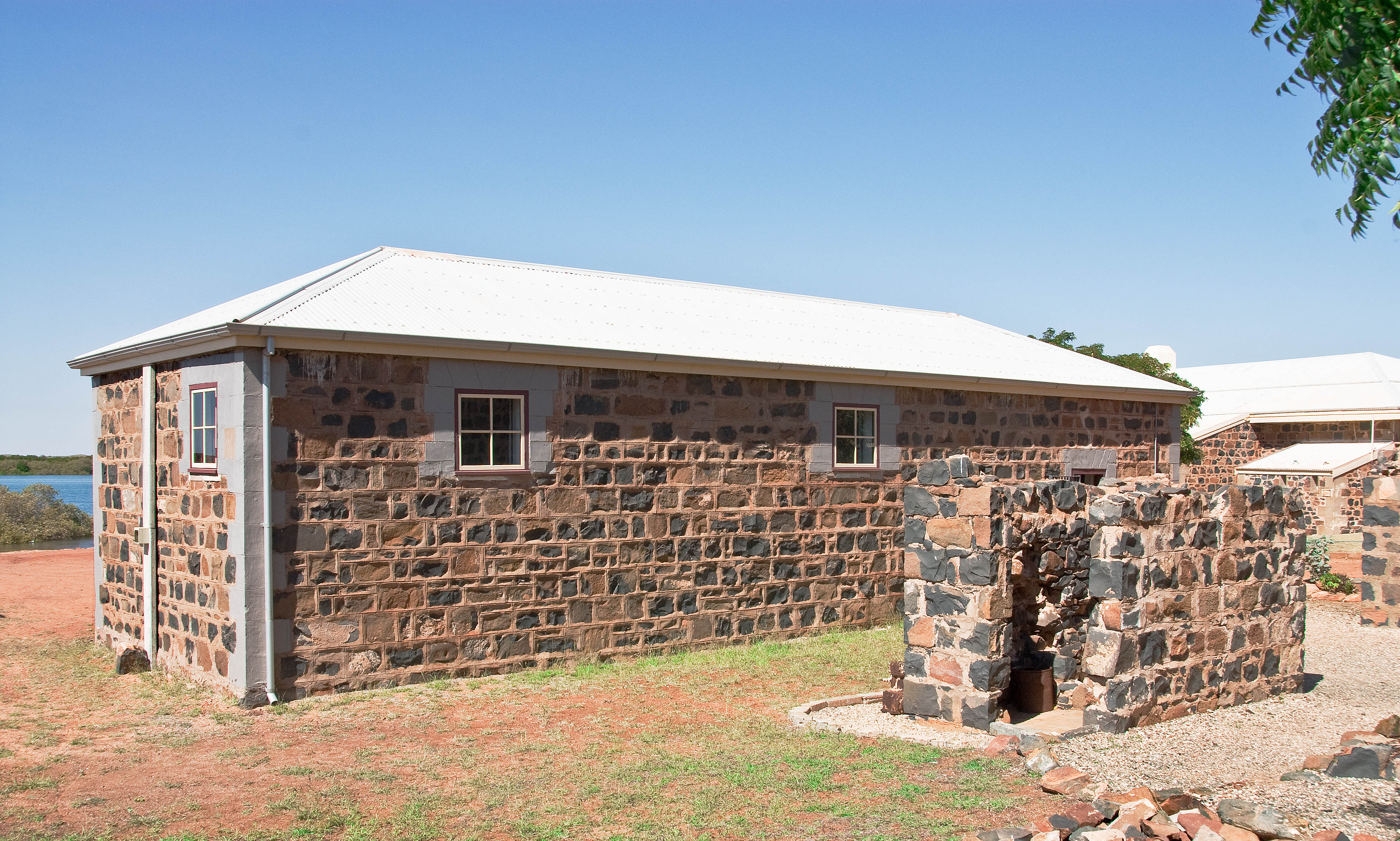
Police lockup and ruins of toilet blocks (1897; now museum)

By about 1900 there were two hotels in Cossack: the Weld (named after the governor) and the White Horse (opposite the wharf).

== Cemetery ==
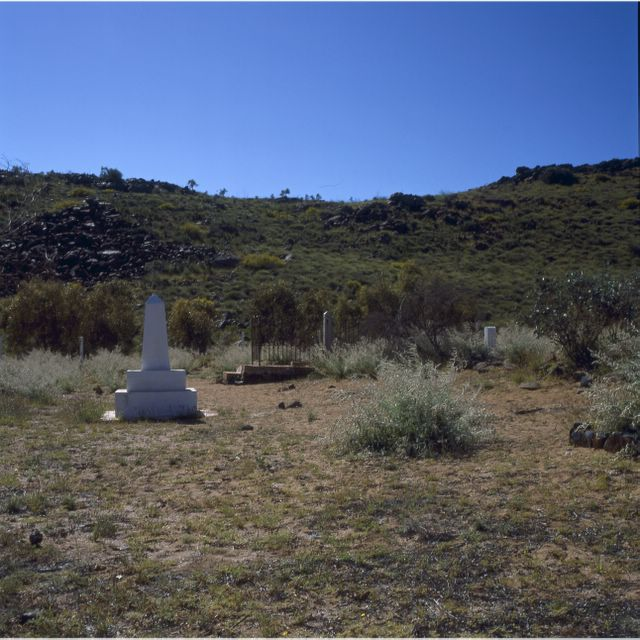
Cossack cemetery

Cossack contains a small cemetery comprising separate European and Japanese precincts. The pearling industry of the 19th century was notably dangerous, with many pearlers losing their lives. Those buried in the Japanese cemetery were mainly divers and others involved with the pearling industry; others, including many Aborigines, were lost at sea. The first interment in the cemetery is believed to have taken place in 1869, when a man died while walking to Port Walcott in January and was buried there.

At least 41 Europeans and seven Japanese were buried there, with the last interment recorded in 1915. Those buried there include William Shakespeare Hall.

== See also ==
- Paspaley
