= Mulga Downs Station =

Pastoral lease in Western Australia

Coordinates: 22.101°S 118.47°E

Location in Western Australia

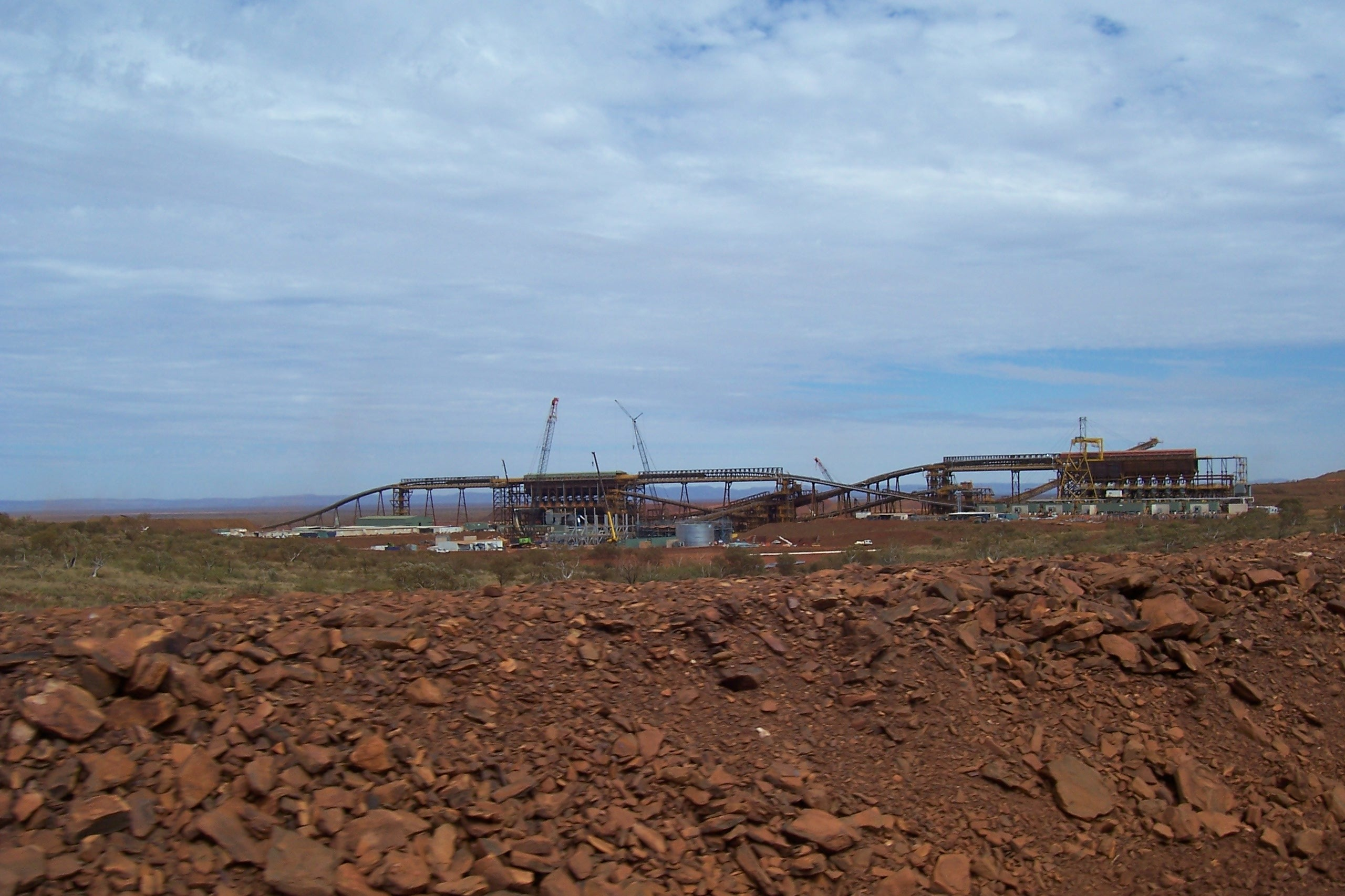

Mulga Downs Station is a pastoral lease that once operated as a sheep station but is currently operating as a cattle station in Western Australia.

It is located 96 km (60 mi) north east of Tom Price and 167 km (104 mi) south west of Marble Bar in the Pilbara region.

The property currently occupies an area of 385,000 ha (951,356 acres), including parts of the Fortescue River floodplain and the Chichester Range; the homestead is situated near the northern boundary of the property about 50 km (31 mi) north of the ghost town of Wittenoom. Almost the entire area is covered by granted mining tenements or applications that are pending. The Cloudbreak mine, operated by Fortescue, is situated within the boundaries of the station.

The Lockyer brothers owned the property in 1891, and transferred 3,000 sheep, 300 cattle and 300 horses from another of their properties, Cooya Pooya, to Mulga Downs for fattening the same year.

Following the death of George Lockyer in 1893, the property was advertised in 1894. At this time it consisted of 830,000 acres (335,889 ha) and was carrying a flock of 3,200 sheep, 300 cattle and 230 horses. Improvements listed included having 30 wells, 70 mi (113 km) of fencing, and three secure sheep paddocks with numerous huts and sheds. The country was described as "first class mulga saltbush, cotton and blue bush, heavily grassed with weeping, silver plain, flinders and other grasses".

In 1894 Burges and Sons sold Mulga Downs to the Union Bank of Australia for £6,000. It was then put up for auction in 1898, advertised as embracing nearly 1,000,000 acres (404,686 ha) with 100 mi (161 km) double frontage to the Fortescue River. At the time only 150,000 acres (60,703 ha) were stocked with 18,000 sheep and 300 horses.

Frank Wittenoom acquired Mulga Downs in the early 1900s. Wittenoom was in partnership with S.L. Burges and they suffered many problems with dingos through 1908, to the point where it was thought the station had been abandoned. They switched from sheep to cattle in 1909 then switched back again in 1910, stocking the property with 2,700 sheep in 1911 and adding more fencing and wells. The property was in decline from 1902 to 1915 when Wittenoom employed George Hancock as the manager. Hancock turned the fortunes of Mulga Downs around and Wittenoom rewarded him with a 25% stake in the property. Hancock promptly sold his share of Ashburton Downs Station, which he had inherited from his father, and focused his energy into improving Mulga Downs further. Lang Hancock, George's son, took over management of the property in 1935 at the age of 26 following the retirement of his father. He later discovered and started mining asbestos at Wittenoom Gorge and then discovered the iron ore deposits in the Hamersley Range.

The station was isolated by floodwaters in 1947 when the station manager's son became ill. Lang Hancock rescued the boy in his plane, a Moth Minor, after the Royal Flying Doctor Service plane was thought to be too heavy to land safely.

The property was still carrying sheep and producing wool in 1954, but later switched to cattle.

In 1967 Mulga Downs encompassed an area of 750,000 acres (303,514 ha) and was still owned by Lang Hancock and his sister.

In 2006 large bushfires burnt across the Pilbara for over a week with over 150,000 ha (370,658 acres) of bushland and rangeland in and around the station being consumed.

Approximately 6,500 head of branded cattle and 1,200 feral cattle were grazing the property in 2009, which had an annual turn-off of 3,500 head.

In 2013 Hancock Prospecting lodged documents with the Department of Environmental Regulation seeking approval to construct a 5,000,000 t (4,921,033-long-ton) iron ore operation from a 2.5 km (2 mi) long pit located about 3.5 km (2 mi) from the homestead.
