= Point Samson, Western Australia =

Point Samson
- Town
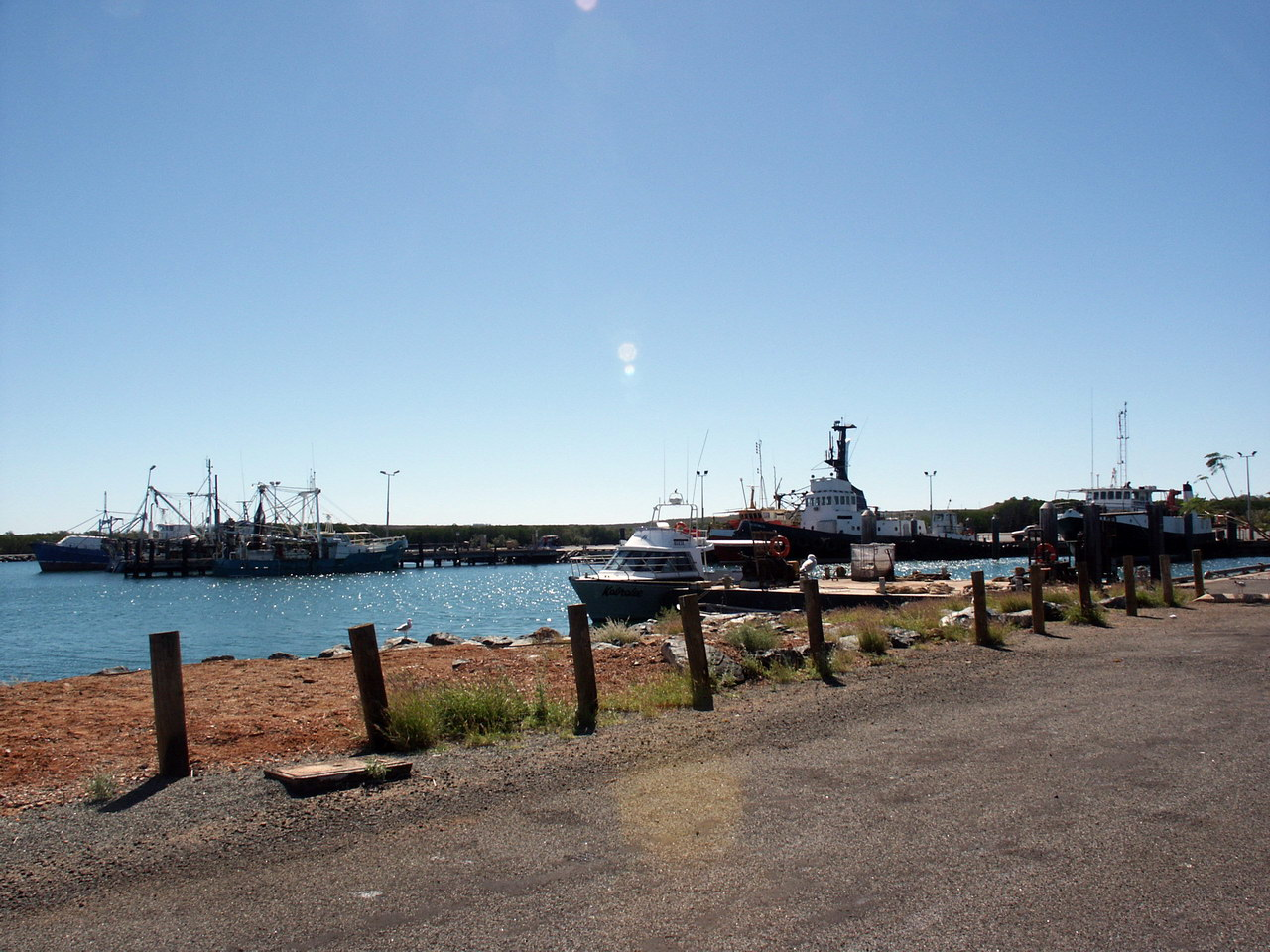
- Point Samson, Western Australia

- Coordinates: 20°38′00″S 117°12′00″E
- Country: Australia
- State: Western Australia
- LGA(s): City of Karratha
- Location: 38 km (24 mi) from Karratha
- Established: 1880s

Government
  - State electorate(s): North West
  - Federal division(s): Durack

Area
  - Total: 359.8 km^{2} (138.9 sq mi)

Population
  - Total(s): 235 (UCL 2021)
- Postcode: 6720
- Mean max temp: 31.9 °C (89.4 °F)
- Mean min temp: 20.1 °C (68.2 °F)
- Annual rainfall: 295.0 mm (11.61 in)

Point Samson is a small coastal settlement 1,579 kilometres (981 mi) north of Perth and 18 kilometres (11 mi) north of Roebourne in the Pilbara region of Western Australia. The town is a popular holiday location for the nearby mining towns, including Wickham, Karratha and Dampier. Fishing is the main industry.

From 1938 to 1966 blue asbestos, also known as crocidolite, was carried here by truck from Wittenoom for shiploading by the Australian Blue Asbestos company.

The townsite was investigated for further development in the 1980s.

The population of Point Samson was 235 at the 2021 census, slightly up from 231 at the 2016 census, down from 298 in 2011 and 274 in 2006.
