= HMS Roebuck (1690) =

Fifth-rate warship of the Royal Navy

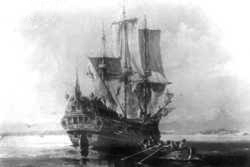
- Arrival of Roebuck in Shark Bay, from a painting by John Charles Allcot (1925)

History

Red Ensign used by the Royal Navy and merchant vessels of the Kingdom of England from 1620–1707
- Name: HMS Roebuck
- Builder: Snellgrove
- Launched: 17 April 1690
- Fate: Sank, February 1701

General characteristics
- Class & type: Fifth-rate
- Tons burthen: 292 tons bm
- Length: 96 ft (29 m)
- Beam: 25 ft 6 in (7.77 m)
- Armament: 26 guns

Service record
- Commanders: William Dampier

HMS (Note: The abbreviation "HMS" would not have been applied to Roebuck at the time, as this was not formally adopted until 1789. It is used here only to indicate ship's official status.) Roebuck was a fifth-rate warship in the Royal Navy which, under the command of William Dampier, carried the first British scientific expedition to Australia in 1699. It sank in early 1701. The wreck of the ship has since been located by a team from the WA Maritime Museum at a site on the coast of Ascension Island where it foundered more than 300 years ago.

== Construction and early service ==
Roebuck was built by Snellgrove at Wapping, East London, and launched on 17 April 1690 during the reign of William III and Mary II as one of 12 purpose-built fireships. It carried 8 guns, was 292 tons (builder's measure), 96 ft (29 m) long, and 25.5 ft (8 m) wide. In June 1690 Roebuck was present at the Battle of Beachy Head.

Around 1695 the ship was upgraded and listed as a 26-gun fifth-rate. Though plans and models of similar ships survive, being a relatively lowly vessel at its time of construction, no contemporary plans of Roebuck itself have been found. This lack of detail has resulted in considerable disagreement until recently about the vessel's appearance. As a result, only notional images have appeared in artwork and on postage stamps.

== Voyage of discovery ==
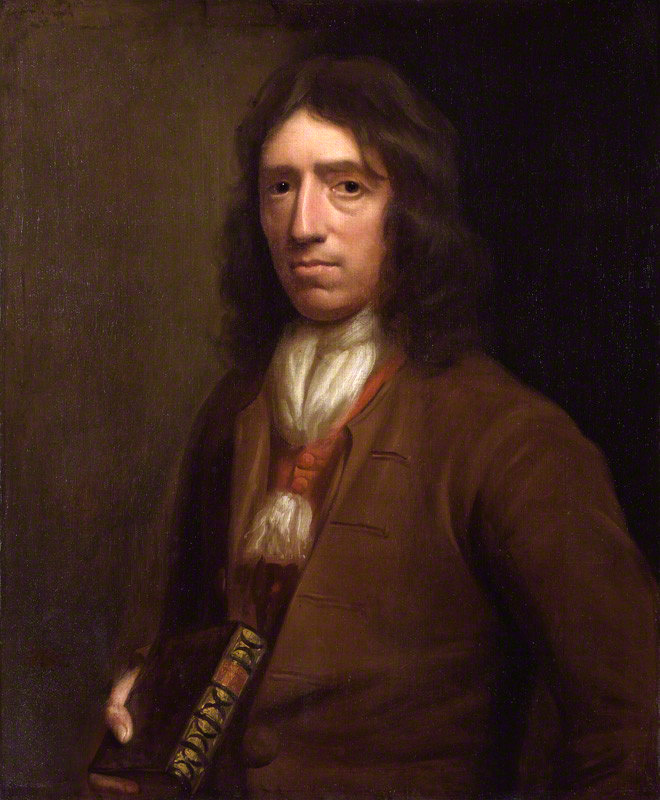
William Dampier, Roebuck's captain, tasked with surveying the coast of New Holland, by Thomas Murray. National Portrait Gallery, London.

After a period of relative obscurity, Roebuck was placed under the command of William Dampier in July 1698. This anomalous appointment of a former buccaneer to the command of one of King William's ships is explained by Dampier's growing reputation as he travelled widely and exhibited the famous tattooed Prince Jeoly and his mother. Purchased during his first circumnavigation, they had been described in a broadsheet from 1691 to 1692 as a "just wonder of the age". This popularity translated into greater recognition among academics, seafarers, politicians and royalty following publication of his remarkable travelogue, A New Voyage Round the World, in 1697.

His acquaintance with influential men such as the recently retired naval administrator Samuel Pepys is evident from the following entry of the diarist John Evelyn on 16 August 1698: "I dined with Mr Pepys, where was Captain Dampier, who had been a famous buccaneer, had brought hither the painted prince Job [Jeoly], and printed a relation of his very strange adventure. ... He was now going abroad again by the king’s encouragement, who furnished a ship of 290 tons. He seemed a more modest man than one would imagine by relation of the crew he had associated with". Roebuck, the naval ship referred to here, was a replacement for Jolly Prize which Dampier found totally unsuited for his plans to search for Terra Australis and to examine the then uncharted eastern coast of New Holland (Australia) via Cape Horn, a notoriously difficult and dangerous route.

=== Outbound to Terra Australis ===
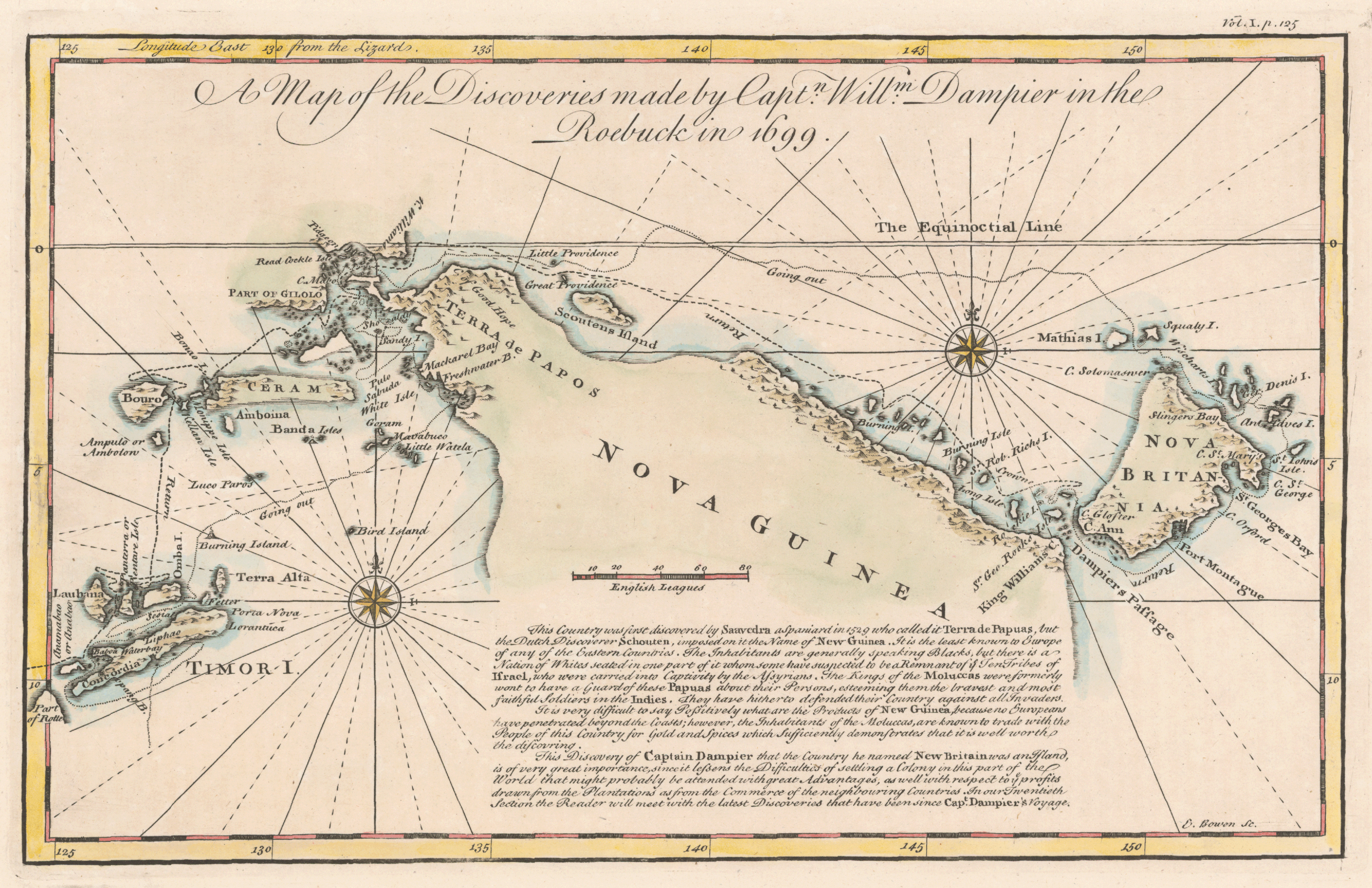
Map of discoveries made on Roebuck's voyage in 1699 includes the island of Nova Britannia

Having made Roebuck ready too late in the season to take his preferred route via Cape Horn, Dampier sailed from England on 14 January 1699 for the Cape of Good Hope. Trouble, centring on acrimony between Dampier and his first lieutenant, George Fisher, divided the ship. They were apparently "behaving equally as boors without a spark of dignity or self-respect ... alternately drinking together, back-biting one another to their confidants, and breaking into personal abuse and even fisticuffs in presence of the crew". A state of indiscipline ensued, and en route Fisher was caned by Dampier, clapped in irons and confined to his quarters. The crew was divided on the matter and, concerned at the possibility of mutiny, Dampier had Fisher sent ashore at Bahia in Brazil, where he was imprisoned for a time before making his way home.

At the Cape of Good Hope, Dampier found the variation in compass readings there anomalous, stating in his journal "These things, I confess, did puzzle me—indeed were most shocking to me." Admiral William Henry Smyth, subsequently made the comment that, "though the local magnetic attraction in ships had fallen under the notice of seamen, he [Dampier] was among the first to lead the way to its investigation, since the facts that 'stumbled' him at the Cape of Good Hope, respecting the variations of the compass, excited the mind of [Matthew] Flinders, his ardent admirer, to study the anomaly."

Continuing on after leaving the Cape of Good Hope, Dampier first made landfall in August 1699 on the Australian continent at the place he subsequently named Shark Bay in Western Australia. There and at places further north such as Lagrange Bay, just south of what is now known as Broome in Roebuck Bay, he described and collected many specimens, including shells, subsequently earning the title "Australia's first natural historian". After calling in to Timor in November, Dampier sailed to the north-west cape of New Guinea in the vicinity of present-day Selat Dampier, West Papua. There he sent his men ashore at a "small woody island" he called Cockle Island. His men brought back many giant clam shells. They then sailed around the northern part of New Guinea, naming Nova Britannia. The passage between those two islands, Dampier Strait, was subsequently named after him.

=== Return voyage and shipwreck ===
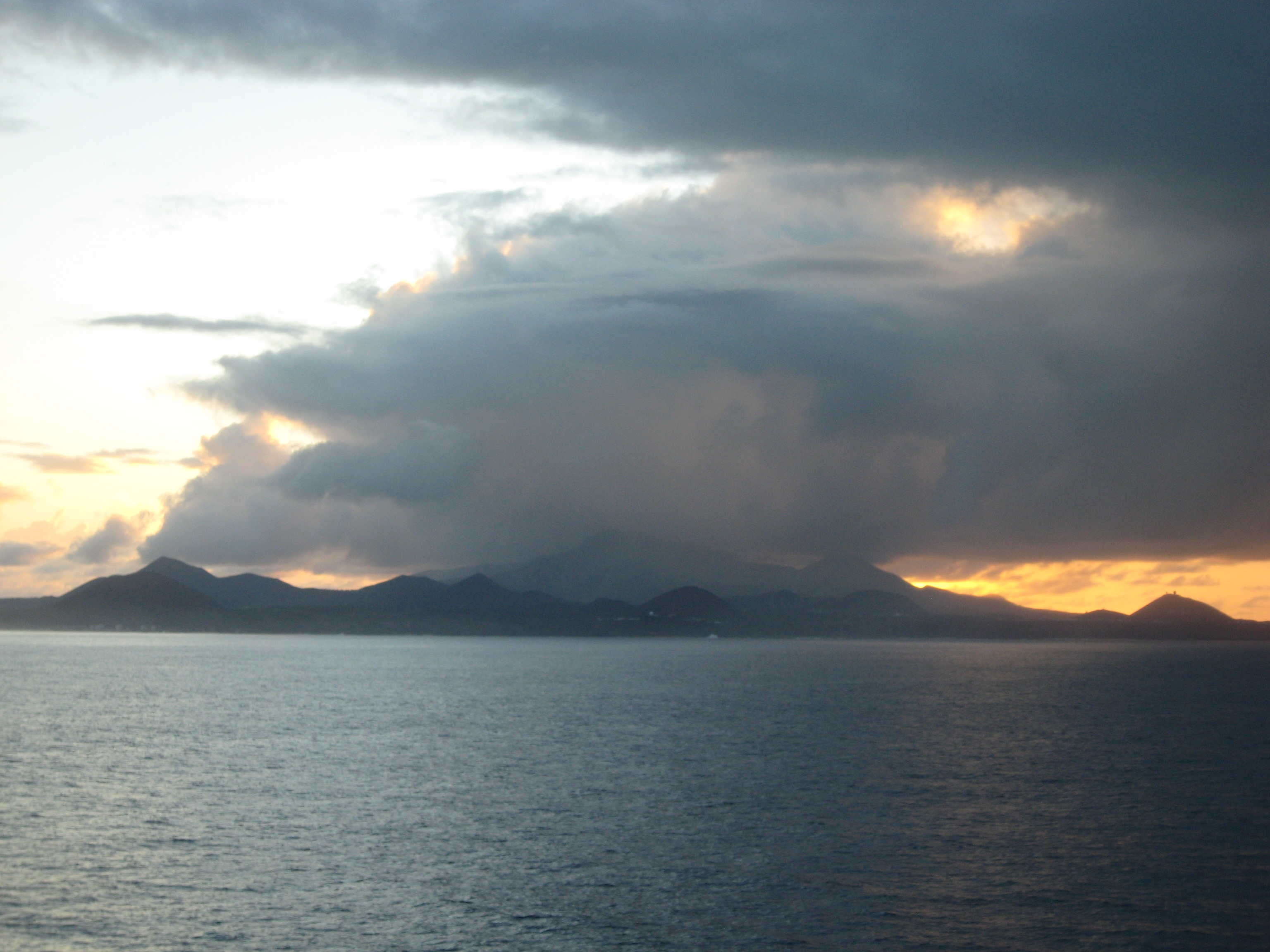
Ascension Island, as Dampier would have seen it, approaching from the south in Roebuck

Concerned at the condition of his vessel, which was being eaten away by shipworms, Dampier abandoned his plan to proceed further south to explore the eastern Australian coast in March 1700, leaving its exploration to Lieutenant James Cook over half a century later. After sailing back into the Indian Ocean, Dampier headed off south in search of the elusive Tryal Rocks, scene of the loss of the English East India Company ship Tryall in 1622, the first known European ship to be lost on the Australian coast. Leaking badly and unable to continue in the search, Roebuck headed to Batavia, the headquarters of the Dutch East India Company and the centre of a vast trading network with China, Japan, India and Europe. After effecting some repairs, they left Batavia, arriving back at the Cape of Good Hope by the end of December.

In mid-January 1701 they left, and after staying at St Helena until 13 February, they proceeded to Ascension Island, which they sighted on 21 February. While there, the ship sprang a very serious leak in the fourth row of planking from the keel, which proved impossible to stem. When a sea breeze began to blow, they ran in toward the shore but were forced to anchor in 13 metres (42 ft) when the breeze died. After carrying a small anchor ashore on the night of 23 February, the crew warped the vessel in until it grounded in 6 metres (21 ft) of water. The crew then left the ship after saving some items, including Dampier's journals and various specimens. After finding a spring of fresh water inland, they remained alive, though suffering many privations.

On 8 April four East India Company ships entered the bay in which Roebuck was lost and took the marooned sailors on board. One of the vessels, Hastings, elected to recover an anchor and cable, apparently the one used to warp Roebuck ashore. This proved successful, but a grappling anchor was lost. The ships then transported Dampier and his crew home, where he published an account of the voyage in 1703 entitled A Voyage to New Holland—again to great acclaim. Though this further cemented his reputation as an explorer, at the court martial into the loss of his ship Dampier was roundly criticised for his treatment of Fisher, destroying any further attempt at official patronage. He later gave the plant collections he had saved from the wreck to the Royal Society, and they eventually found their way to the University of Oxford.

== Search for the wreck ==
Though made famous by its association with Dampier, the position of the wreck became lost over time, in part because early documents provided conflicting evidence as to its whereabouts. Dampier himself added to the confusion when he wrote to the Earl of Pembroke, Lord President of the Council, indicating that his ship may have drifted back out to sea: "The world is apt to judge of every thing by the success; and whoever has ill fortune will hardly be allowed a good name. This, my Lord, was my unhappiness in my late expedition in Roebuck, which foundered through perfect age near the island of Ascension". Many expeditions went in search of the wreck after the advent of scuba diving, but all proved unsuccessful.

=== Wreck site located ===
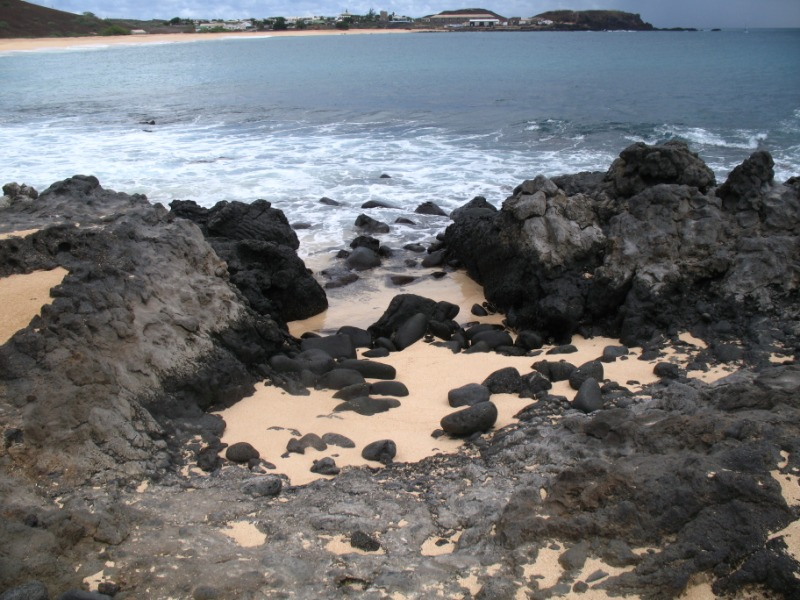
Clarence Bay, Ascension Island, where the wreck of Roebuck was discovered in 2001

In 2000 the WA Maritime Museum in Fremantle commissioned a search of the primary sources in England. The many sources located and copied for the museum suggested that the wreck of Roebuck lay in the shallows of Clarence Bay on the north-west coast of Ascension Island. Others had already searched in that location but had been stymied by the size of the bay and an extensive cover of sand.

By March 2001, based on their extensive study, the museum team believed they had a fair idea of Roebuck's position in February 1701 when the ship sank. Arriving at the island, and anchoring over the approximate position in the bay where they believed the grounding site to be, they experienced the same unusually sustained sea breeze that Dampier had described some 300 years earlier. When they examined the seabed, they discovered that a large and very recent movement of sand from the bay had exposed rock and other formations not seen by local divers in the 40 years since diving first began on the island.

Conducting a search from the beach out to the 6 metres (21 ft) of water described by Dampier, divers soon located an exposed bell. They then located a large clam shell in a cleft in the reef on the seabed south of the bell, and a heavily concreted grapnel anchor in shallower water about 328 ft (100 m) south of the bell and 26 ft (8 m) from shore. In a very turbulent location, two slightly tapering iron objects very similar to the remains of heavily eroded cannon were seen. These lay in the wave line, and were firmly wedged amongst the rocks. All were left in situ.

Being loose and potentially endangered objects, the island's administrator subsequently requested that the museum team remove the clam and the bell in association with the Ascension Island and Royal Air Force dive clubs. On retrieval, the bell was found to carry a broad arrow, confirming its Royal Navy origin. Of all the naval vessels lost on the Island, only Roebuck had not been found up to that time. Sent to the Mary Rose Laboratories in Portsmouth for treatment and replication, the original objects were returned to the island for exhibition. The replicas were made for display at the WA Maritime Museum.

=== Finds analyzed ===
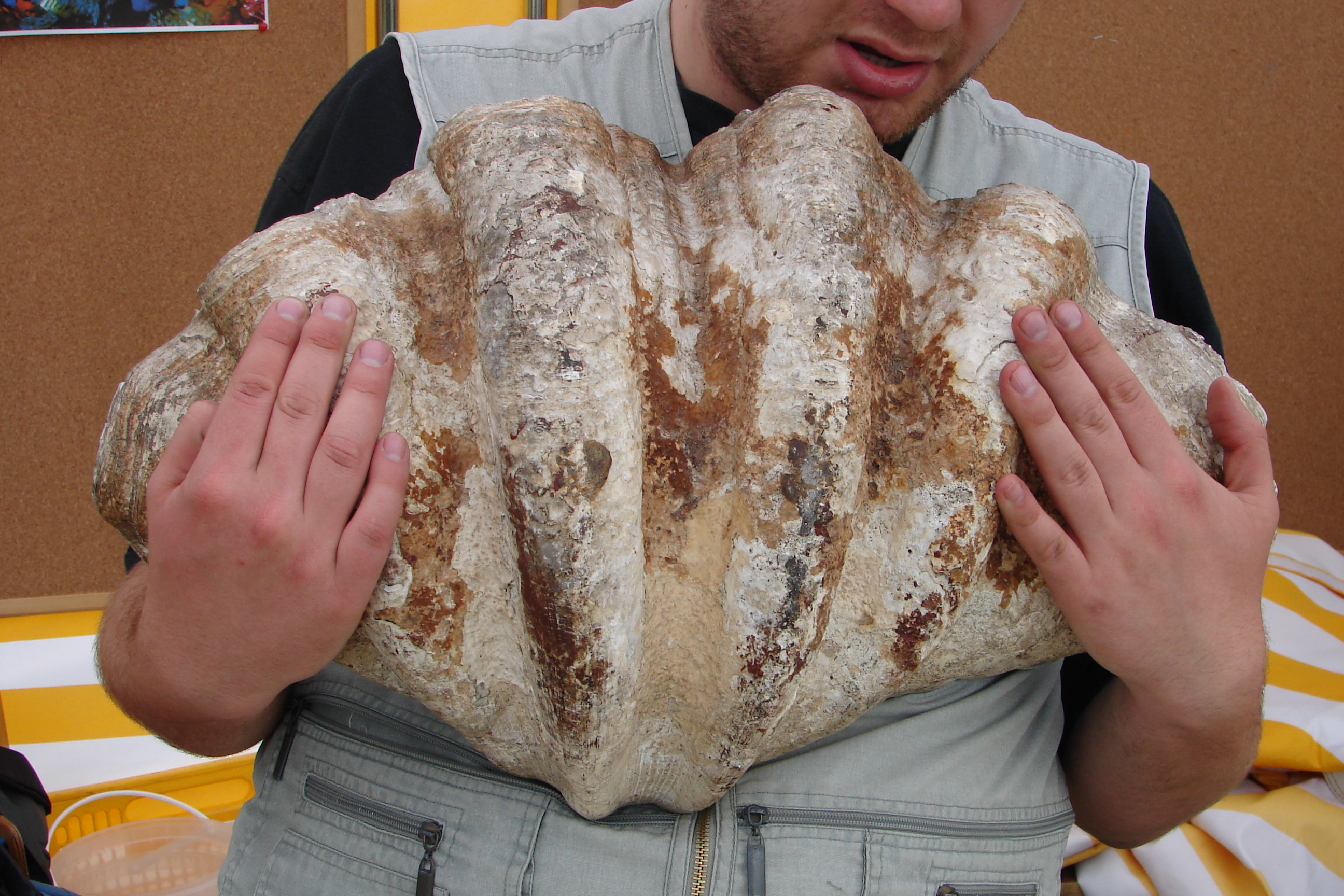
Giant clam shell of the same genus native to the Indo-Pacific found by divers at the Roebuck wreck site

Soon after the bell and clam were found, a long-time island resident and diver showed the Australian museum team an ornate blue-and-white ceramic lid and an intact brown earthenware pot that he had found several weeks earlier projecting from the seabed. These have since proved consistent with Roebuck's time and travels, with the jar probably produced at kilns in Guangdong Province, China. The blue-and-white jar lid and the shards are products of the Jingdezhen kilns, Jiangxi Province, China, with Batavia (now Jakarta) being the most likely trade source. The clam was of the genus Tridacna and possibly the species Tridacna squamosa from the tropical and sub-tropical waters of the Indo-Pacific as far south as Shark Bay. A few weeks after the team left, Clarence Bay began to return to its normal configuration, and within a few months the site was again totally covered by sand.

A maritime historian assisted the museum in producing a detailed analysis of Roebuck, including line drawings and descriptions. Crucial to this process was the location of the long-lost contract for the building of the ship at the National Archives (United Kingdom). Based on that study, an experienced model-maker constructed a 1:24 scale model, which was donated to the Western Australian Museum and put on display in Fremantle with a backdrop of the vessel's sail-plan.

== Sources ==
- Callander, John (1768). Terra Australis Cognita or Voyages to the Terra Australis. Vol. 3. London: The Bodley Head.
- George, Alexander S. (1999). William Dampier in New Holland: Australia's First Natural Historian. Hawthorn, Victoria: Bloomings Books. ISBN 978-187-64-7312-9.
- Masefield, John, ed. (1906). Dampier's Voyages: Consisting of a New Voyage Round the World, a Supplement to the Voyage Round the World, Two Voyages to Campeachy, a Discourse of Winds, a Voyage to New Holland, and a Vindication in Answer to the Chimerical Relation of William Funnell. Vol. 1. London: E. Grant Richards.
- McCarthy, Michael (2002). Report No. 159: His Majesty's Ship Roebuck (1690-1701) (PDF). Fremantle, Western Australia: WA Maritime Museum. Archived from the original (PDF) on 29 October 2013.
- McCarthy, Michael & Godard, Philippe (2001). Report No. 155: HM Ship Roebuck—Clues to Its Location and Subsequent Identification (PDF). Fremantle, Western Australia: WA Maritime Museum. Archived from the original (PDF) on 31 May 2012.
- Sexton, Robert (2011). "Dampier's Roebuck". Bulletin of the Australasian Institute for Maritime Archaeology. 35 (1): 28–38.
- "Model of Dampier's Roebuck Now on Exhibition". WA Maritime Museum. 2013.
- Wilkinson, Clennell (1929). William Dampier. London: The Bodley Head.
- Williamson, James A., ed. (1939). William Dampier: A Voyage to New Holland. London: The Argonaut Press.
