= Wickham, Western Australia =

Wickham
- Town
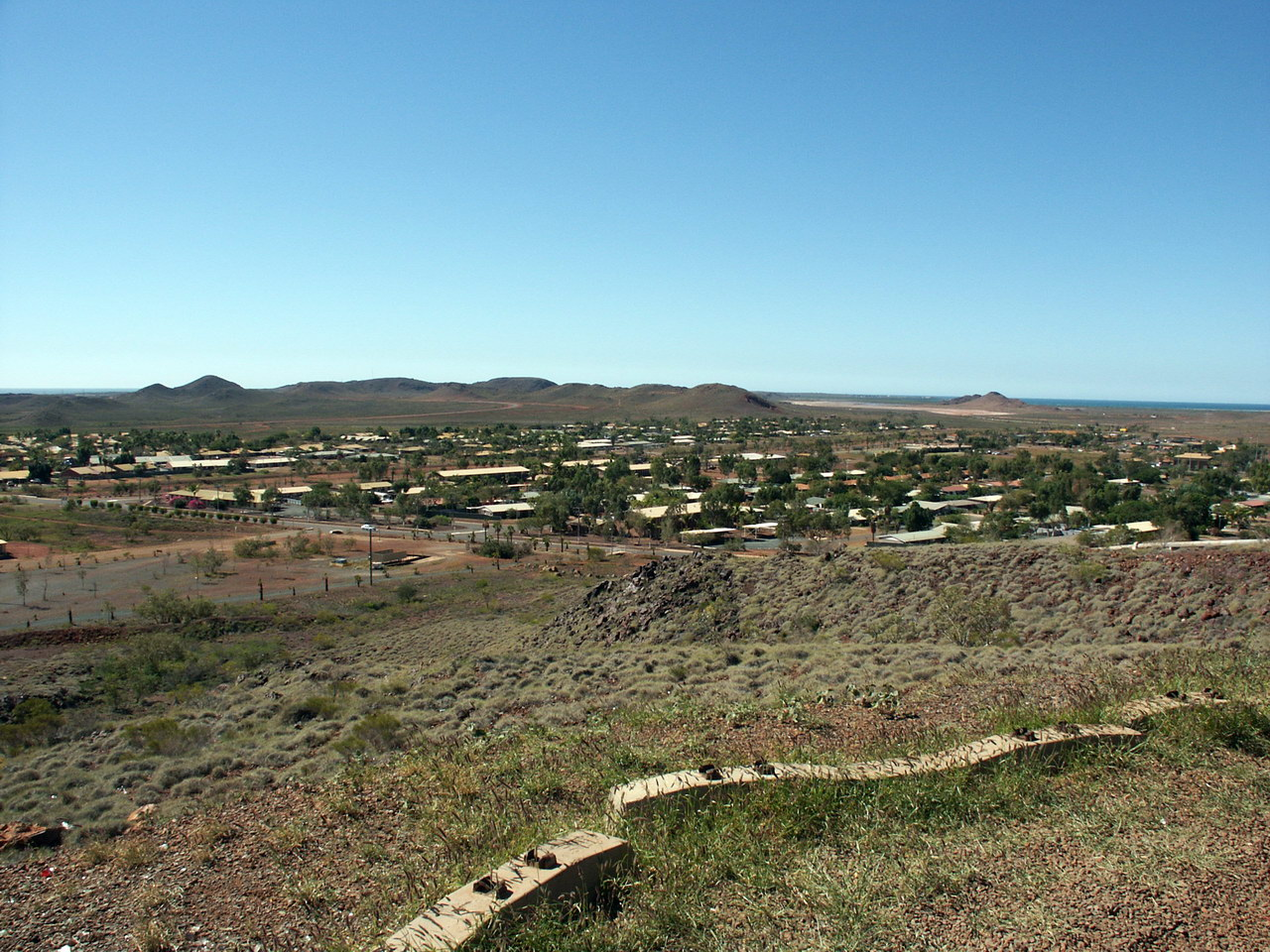
- Wickham townsite

- Interactive map of Wickham
- Coordinates: 20°40′30″S 117°08′25″E
- Country: Australia
- State: Western Australia
- LGA: City of Karratha
- Location: 33 km (21 mi) from Karratha
- Established: 1970

Government
  - State electorate: Pilbara
  - Federal division: Durack

Area
  - Total: 24.1 km^{2} (9.3 sq mi)

Population
  - Total: 2,016 (UCL 2021)
- Postcode: 6720
- Mean max temp: 31.9 °C (89.4 °F)
- Mean min temp: 20.1 °C (68.2 °F)
- Annual rainfall: 295.0 mm (11.61 in)

Wickham is a town located 1,572 km north of Perth and 13 km north of Roebourne in the Pilbara region of Western Australia. In 2016 Wickham had a population of 2,295 people. Aboriginal people made up 17.2% of the population, five times the state average.

== History ==
Wickham was established in 1970 by Cliffs Robe River Iron Associates (Robe) and named after John Clements Wickham, the captain of HMS Beagle, who surveyed the north-west coast in 1840.

The town's first permanent buildings were completed in 1970 by Robe to support its iron-ore mine at Pannawonica, and pelletising plant and shiploading at Cape Lambert. The majority of the residences and facilities in town are owned by Rio Tinto. Wickham was originally a closed company town but from 1980 has been jointly administered by Robe and the Shire of Roebourne. In August 2000 Rio Tinto acquired a majority interest in the Robe River Iron Associates joint venture and in 2012 established a new Wickham South subdivision that included 212 new dwellings, 25 residential lots, and 198 new fly-in fly-out accommodation units.

== Notable people ==
- Amber Bradley, rower
- Tanya Oxtoby, soccer coach and former player
- Lawson Humphries, AFL player
