= Harding River =

River in Western Australia

Coordinates: 20°41′27″S 117°10′55″E

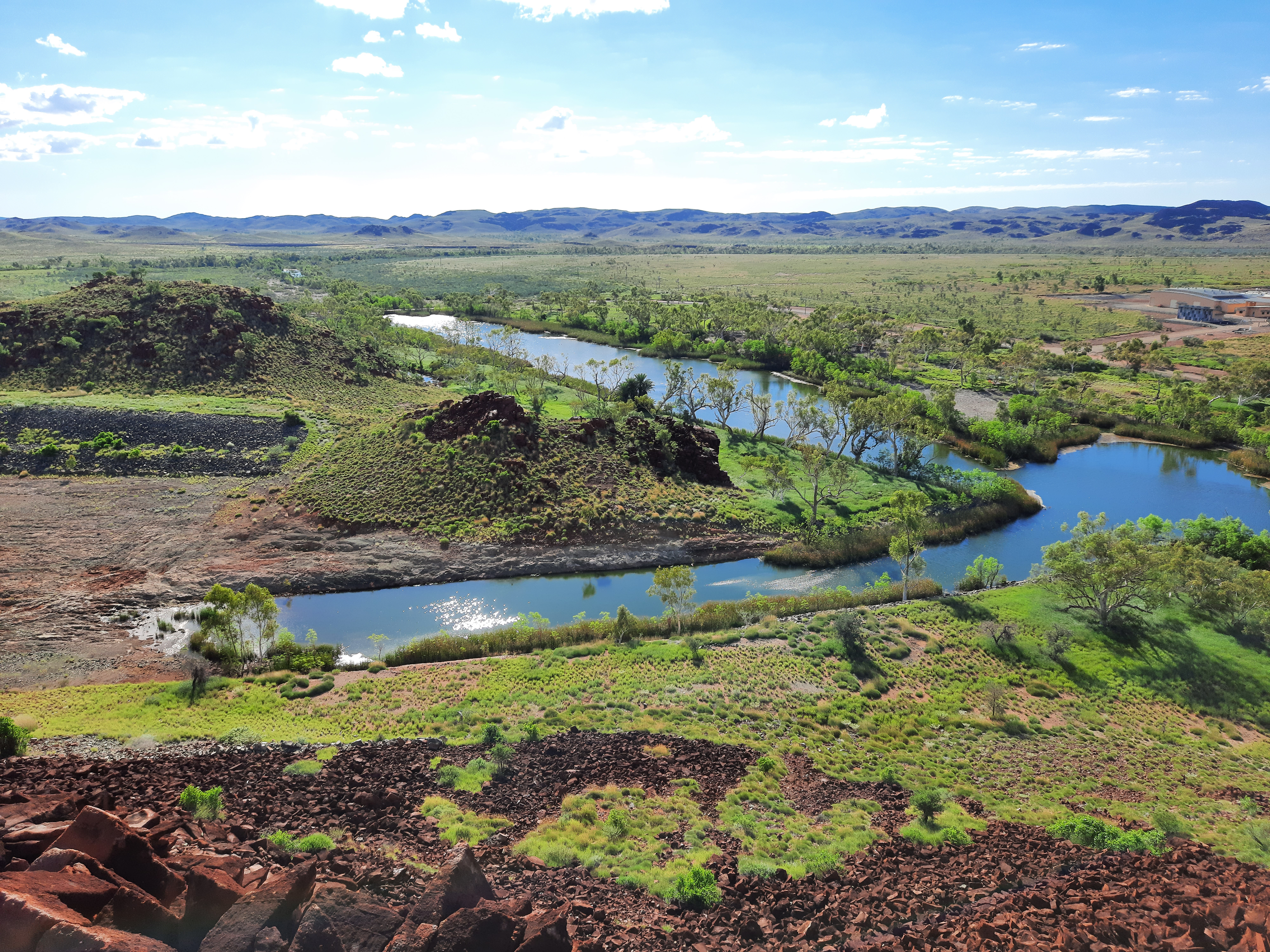
- The Harding River in May 2021

Location
- Country: Australia

Physical characteristics
- Source
  - location: Chichester Range
  - elevation: 311 metres (1,020 ft)
- Mouth
  - location: Indian Ocean
  - elevation: sea level
- Length: 150 km (93 mi)

The Harding River, known as the Ngurin in Ngarluma language, is a river in the Pilbara region of Western Australia. It was named on 31 July 1861 by the surveyor and explorer Francis Gregory while on expedition in the area, after one of the volunteer members of his expedition, John Harding. The river continues to be known as the Ngurin by traditional owners and local Aboriginal people.

The headwaters of the river rise in the Chichester Range in the Millstream-Chichester National Park near Merrinyaginya Spring and flow is a northerly direction. The river flows through Lake Poongkaliyarra and out through Lockyer Gap. The river continues northward and crosses the North West Coastal Highway near Roebourne then discharges into the Indian Ocean via Butcher Inlet.

The river flows through a number of permanent and semi-permanent pools such as Murringa Pool, Karrawingina Pool and Bamba Pool.

The river has six tributaries: Harding River East, East Harding River, Murray Camp Creek and Miller Creek.
