= Inawongga =

Western Australian Aboriginal people

The Yinhawangka are an Aboriginal Australian people of the Pilbara region of Western Australia.

== Country ==
The Inawongga, in Norman Tindale's estimation, has about 3,600 square miles (9,300 km^{2}) of tribal territory, living in the area around the Hardey River and as far south as Rocklea. Their southeastern extension runs along the upper Ashburton River from Turee Creek to the Angelo River, and north of Mount Vernon Station.

Running clockwise from due north, their neighbours are the Kurrama to their northwest, the Panyjima north-northeast, the Mandara due east, the Ngarlawongga to their southeast, the Ninanu directly south and the Tjururo on their western flank.

== Alternative spelling ==
- Inawangga

== Sources ==
- "AIATSIS map of Indigenous Australia". AIATSIS. 14 May 2024.
- "Tindale Tribal Boundaries" (PDF). Department of Aboriginal Affairs, Western Australia. September 2016. Archived from the original (PDF) on 8 March 2016.
- Tindale, Norman Barnett (1974). "Inawongga (WA)". Aboriginal Tribes of Australia: Their Terrain, Environmental Controls, Distribution, Limits, and Proper Names. Australian National University Press. ISBN 978-0-708-10741-6. Archived from the original on 10 August 2019.
