= Bulloo Downs Station (Western Australia) =

Pastoral lease in Western Australia

Coordinates: 24.001°S 119.572°E

Location in Western Australia

Bulloo Downs Station is a pastoral lease that operates as a cattle station.

== Location ==
It is located about 73 kilometres (45 mi) south of Newman and 307 kilometres (191 mi) north of Meekatharra in the Mid West region of Western Australia. The homestead is found approximately 15 kilometres (9 mi) west of the Great Northern Highway. Bulloo Downs shares boundaries with Mount Vernon, Sylvania, Prairie Downs, Weelarrana and Tangadee Stations as well as areas of vacant crown land.

== Description ==
The station encompasses part of the Ashburton River and is made up of undulating slate and basalt country that support a range of native grasses. There are areas of open flats covered in salt bush and blue bush and stands of mulga. In 1980 the property occupied an area of 3,472 square kilometres (1,341 sq mi) and was carrying 3,100 cattle. The recommended carrying capacity is 2,590 cattle.

== History ==
In 1928 the property was put up for auction by the then owners Messrs J. and L. Smith who also owned Ethel Creek, Bolinda and Illgarrarie Stations. At this stage Bulloo Downs occupied an area of 876,766 acres (354,815 ha) and was carrying 3,000 head of cattle. The property had a five-room homestead, store, workers' quarters, stable, one outcamp and ten sets of stockyards. Stock were watered by pools along the river and 29 wells most of which were equipped with mills and troughing.

The property was passed in at auction and remained unsold in 1929. The property was advertised again in 1940, again unsuccessfully, with the Smiths still owning it in 1944.

In 1951 the owners of Bullo surrendered an 89,524 acres (36,229 ha) portion of land. In 1952 an 18,270 acres (7,394 ha) portion of the northern ends of Bulloo Downs and Weelarrana Stations were opened up for leasing by the Department of Lands and Surveys.

An estimated 20,000 feral donkeys were roaming on Bulloo Downs and neighbouring Prairie Downs Stations in 1957.

== See also ==
- List of ranches and stations
