= Panyjima =

Panyjima (Banyjima, Panytyima) may be,

- Panyjima people
- Panyjima language
