= Mount Bruce =

Mount Bruce may refer to:

- Mount Bruce (Antarctica)
- Mount Bruce (California), in Yosemite National Park, U.S.
- Mount Bruce (Western Australia)
- Pukaha / Mount Bruce National Wildlife Centre, in New Zealand
