= Jurruru =

Jurruru may refer to:

- Jurruru people, an indigenous Australian people
- Jurruru language, an extinct Australian Aboriginal language

== See also ==
- Jururu language (Brazil), an unclassified language of Brazil
