= Mount Meharry =

Mountain in Western Australia

- Panyjima:Wirlbiwirlbi
- Location within Western Australia

Highest point
- Elevation: 1,249 m (4,098 ft)
- Prominence: 836 m (2,743 ft)
- Coordinates: 22°58′S 118°35′E

Geography
- Location: Pilbara region of Western Australia
- Parent range: Hamersley Range

Mount Meharry (Panyjima:Wirlbiwirlbi) is the highest mountain in Western Australia. It is located in the Hamersley Range within the southeastern part of Karijini National Park in the Pilbara region, approximately 86 kilometres (53 mi) south-southeast of Wittenoom, and 87 kilometres (54 mi) east-southeast of Tom Price.

The Pandjima peoples are the traditional owners of the area.

== History ==
Mount Meharry is named after William Thomas Meharry (1912–1967), Chief Geodetic Surveyor for Western Australia from 1959 to 1967. Surveyor Trevor Markey and his party were the first people of European descent to discover the mountain, in 1967. Tom Meharry directed the survey party and performed the calculations that confirmed the mountain was the highest peak in Western Australia, being 15 metres (49 ft) higher than Mount Bruce which lies 62 kilometres (39 mi) northwest of Mount Meharry. Bluff Knoll, highest peak in the Stirling Range and sometimes mistaken as the state's highest, is 150 metres (490 ft) lower than Mount Meharry.

After Meharry's sudden death on 16 May 1967 the Nomenclature Advisory Committee (now the Geographic Names Committee) recommended to the Minister for Lands that the recently discovered peak be named after him. The Minister for Lands Stewart Bovell approved this on 28 July 1967 and a notice naming the peak was published in the Western Australian Government Gazette on 15 September 1967.

In 1999, Gina Rinehart, daughter of Lang Hancock, applied to the Geographic Names Committee to rename the mountain after her father. The application was declined and in 2002 she lobbied the then-Premier Geoff Gallop with the same proposal. He, too, declined the request.

== Geography ==
The summit of Mount Meharry can be reached from the Great Northern Highway via an unsealed road 16 kilometres (9.9 mi) in length and a vehicular track 21 kilometres (13 mi) in length. Permission should be sought from the managers of the land over which the road and track pass. These are Juna Downs Station and the Department of Parks and Wildlife, which manages Karijini National Park. In dry conditions, a two-wheel-drive vehicle can reach the national park boundary at about 800 metres (2,600 ft) elevation, requiring a walk of about 7 kilometres (4.3 mi) to the summit, including an ascent of about 450 metres (1,480 ft).
