= PNW =

PNW may refer to:

- Pacific Northwest, a region including parts of the US and Canada
- The Northwestern United States, also sometimes called "Pacific Northwest"
- Pacific Northwest Wrestling
- Personal NetWare, Novell's peer-to-peer network solution for DOS since 1994
- Portable NetWare, Novell's network solution for Unix in the early 1990
- Purdue University Northwest, a branch campus of Purdue University in Indiana
- Panyjima language of Australia (ISO code: pnw)
- Penge West railway station, London, England (National Rail station code: PNW)
