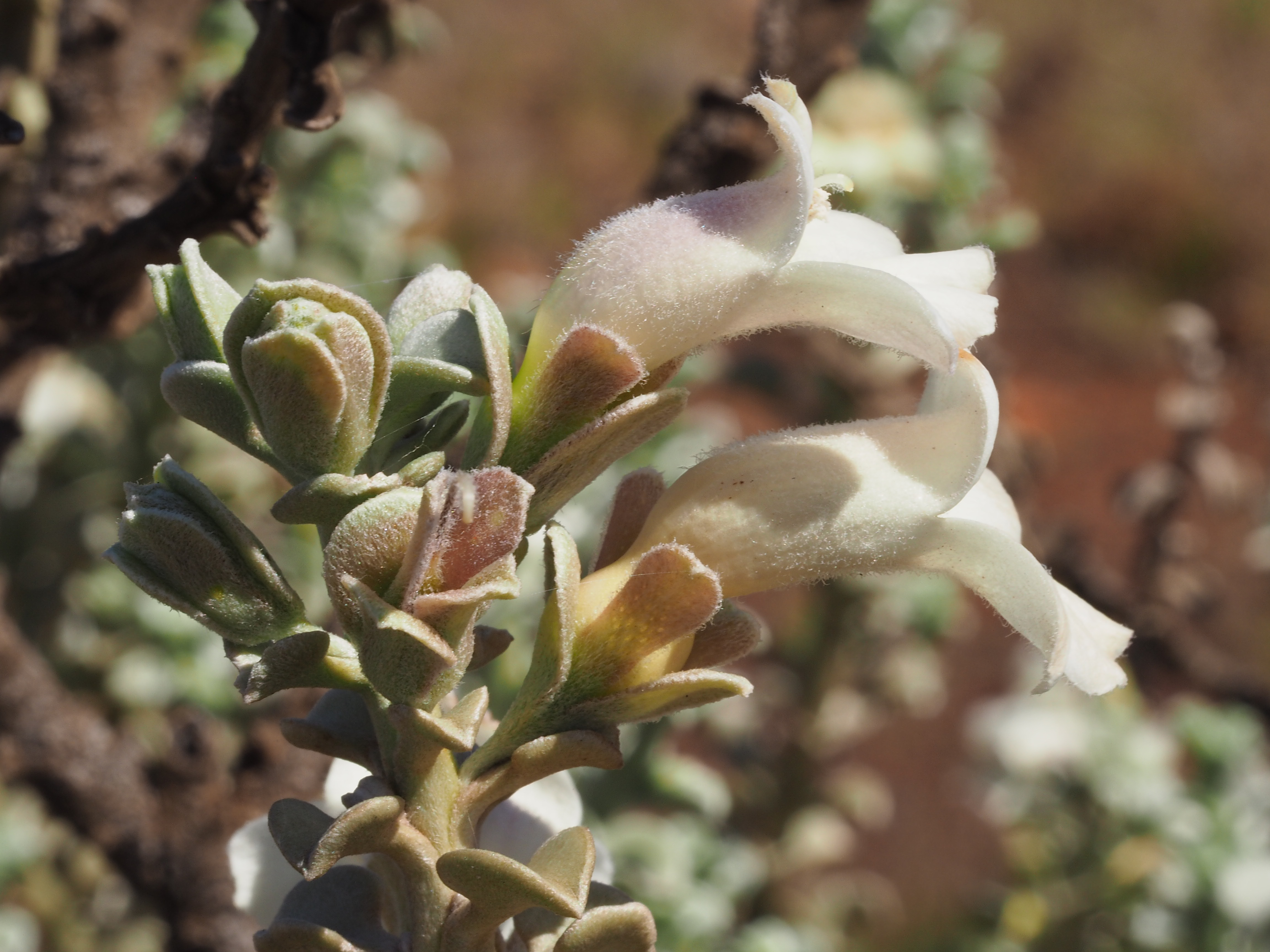

Conservation status
- Priority Three — Poorly Known Taxa (DEC)

Scientific classification
- Kingdom: Plantae
- Clade: Tracheophytes
- Clade: Angiosperms
- Clade: Eudicots
- Clade: Asterids
- Order: Lamiales
- Family: Scrophulariaceae
- Genus: Eremophila
- Species: E. rigida

Binomial name
- Eremophila rigida Chinnock

= Eremophila rigida =

Species of flowering plant

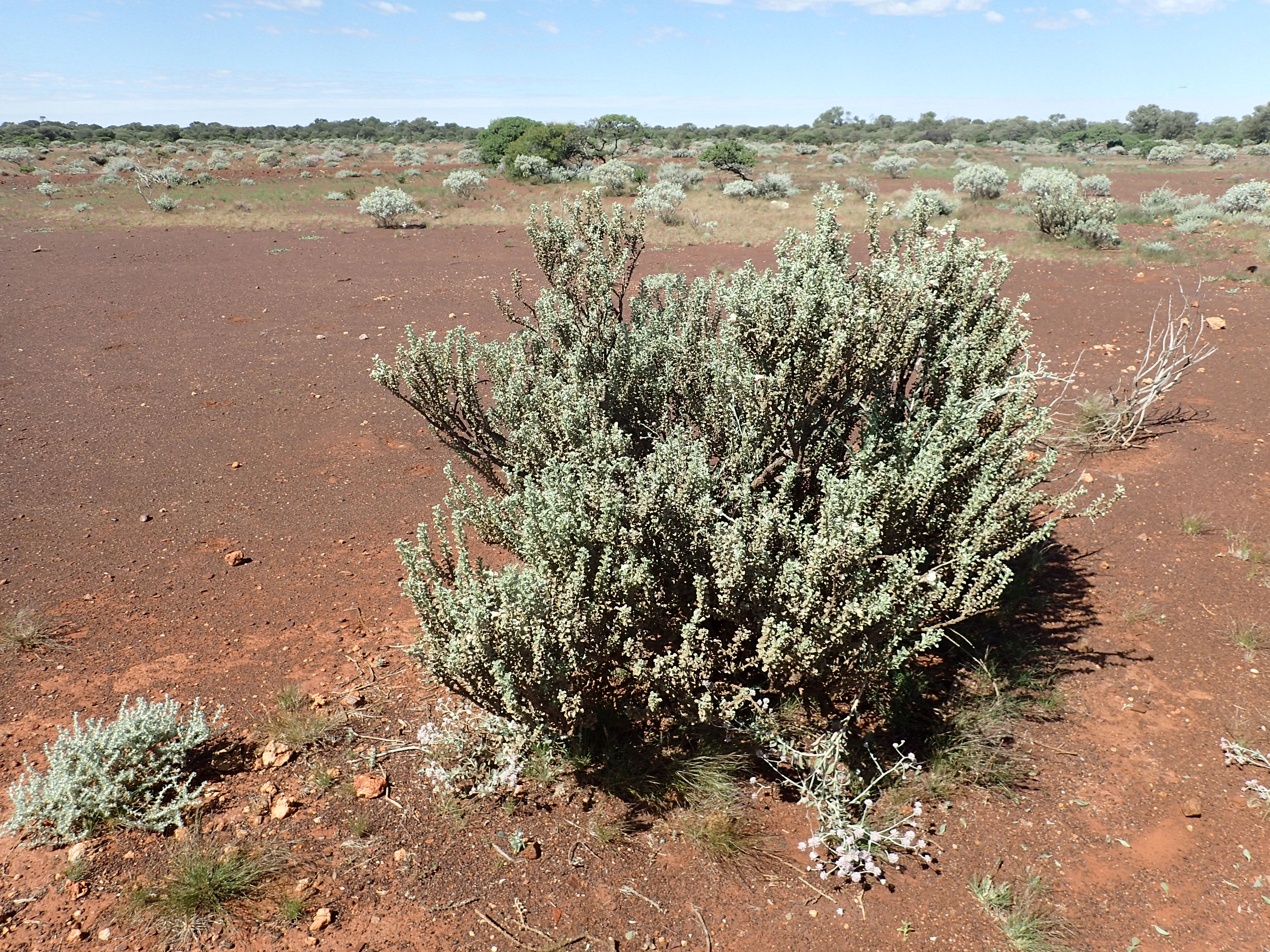
Habit south of Newman

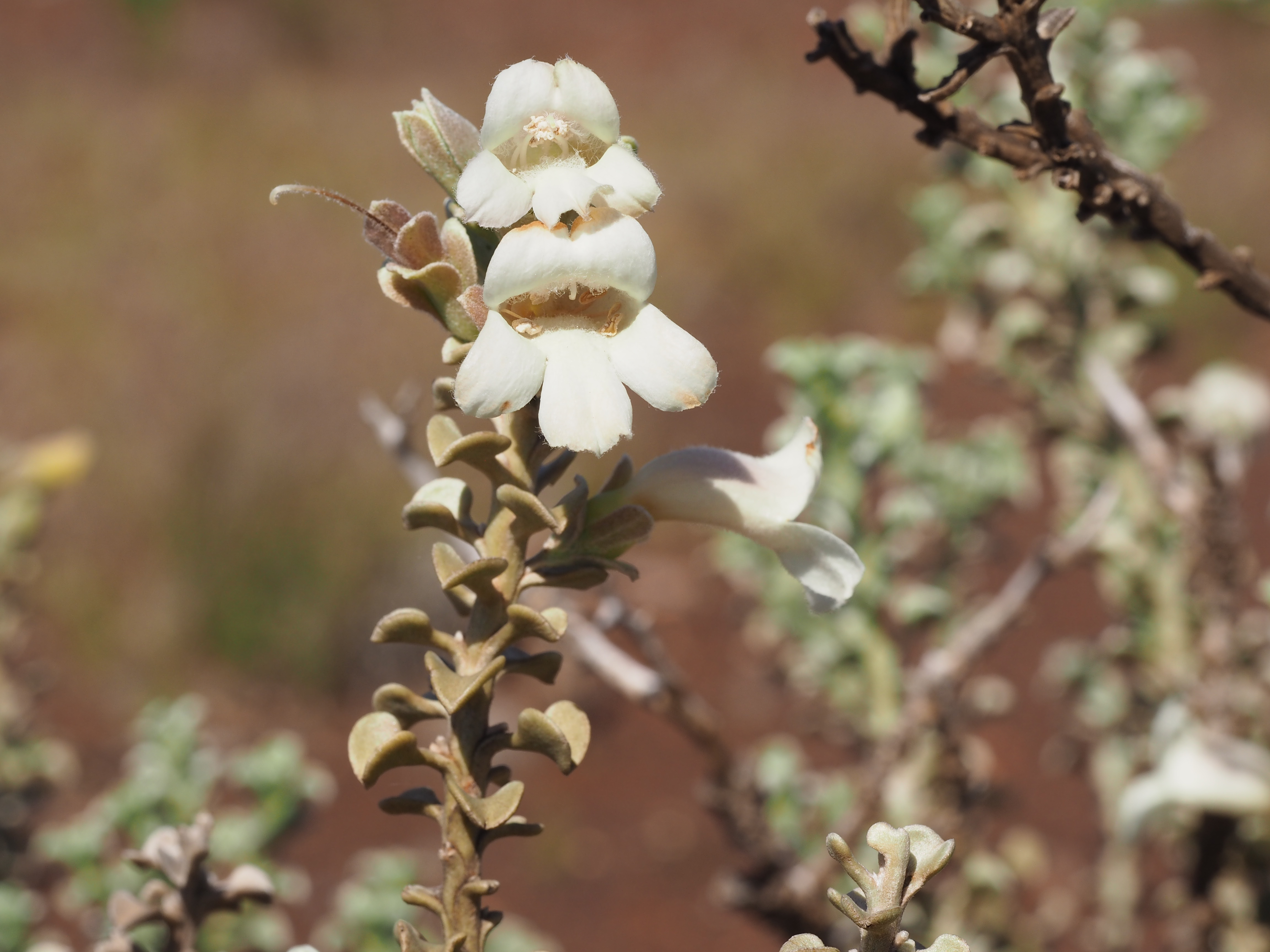
Flower detail

Eremophila rigida is a flowering plant in the figwort family, Scrophulariaceae and is endemic to Western Australia. It is an erect, rigid shrub with thick, hairy, rigid leaves and pale yellowish-cream flowers.

== Description ==
Eremophila rigida is an erect, rigid shrub which grows to a height of between 0.5 and 1.2 m (2 and 4 ft). Its branches and leaves are covered with simple, silvery-grey hairs which become stained brown or reddish. The branches are rough due to persistent raised leaf bases. The leaves are arranged alternately and are thick, very rigid, folded into a U-shape, egg-shaped to kidney-shaped, and have a flattened stalk 3–6 mm (0.1–0.2 in) long. The leaf blade is 9–14 mm (0.4–0.6 in) long and 8–16.5 mm (0.3–0.6 in) wide.

The flowers are borne singly in leaf axils on stalks, 6–8 mm (0.2–0.3 in) long. There are 5 cream-coloured, overlapping, hairy sepals which have a greenish tinge but turn reddish-brown after flowering. The sepals are different shapes, varying from lance-shaped to egg-shaped and are 9–13 mm (0.4–0.5 in) long. The petals are 23–26 mm (0.9–1 in) long and are joined at their lower end to form a tube. The petal tube is cream-coloured sometimes with a lilac tinge on the upper surface. The petal tube and lobes are hairy on the outside, but the inside is glabrous except for part of the lower lobe and the inside of the tube which is filled with long, soft hairs. The 4 stamens are fully enclosed in the petal tube. Flowering occurs from June to September and the fruit which follow are broad oval-shaped, 5.5–7.5 mm (0.2–0.3 in) long and have a hairy covering.

== Taxonomy and naming ==
This species was first formally described by Robert Chinnock in 2007, and the description was published in Eremophila and Allied Genera: A Monograph of the Plant Family Myoporaceae. The specific epithet (rigida) is a Latin word meaning "stiff", "rigid", "hard" or "inflexible" referring to the leaves of this species.

== Distribution and habitat ==
Eremophila rigida grows on stony clay flats in open areas between Meekatharra and Newman in the Gascoyne and Pilbara biogeographic regions.

== Conservation ==
This eremophila is classified as "Priority Three" by the Western Australian Government Department of Parks and Wildlife meaning that it is poorly known and known from only a few locations but is not under imminent threat.

== Use in horticulture ==
The unusual, rigid foliage of this eremophila are attractions, as are the masses of flowers appearing in spring. The best colour forms are those with yellow buds which open to cream-coloured flowers. It is usually propagated by grafting onto Myoporum rootstock and grows best in well-drained soils in a sunny location. It is drought tolerant, requiring only one or two deep waterings during a long dry spell but it is only moderately frost tolerant.
