= Acacia corusca =

Shimmer wattle

Conservation status
- Priority One — Poorly Known Taxa (DEC)

Scientific classification
- Kingdom: Plantae
- Clade: Tracheophytes
- Clade: Angiosperms
- Clade: Eudicots
- Clade: Rosids
- Order: Fabales
- Family: Fabaceae
- Subfamily: Caesalpinioideae
- Clade: Mimosoid clade
- Genus: Acacia
- Species: A. corusca

Binomial name
- Acacia corusca J.P.Bull, S.J.Dillon & Brearley

Species of legume

Acacia corusca, also known as shimmer wattle, is a species of flowering plant in the family Fabaceae and is endemic to a small area in he Pilbara region of Western Australia. It is a rounded, multi-stemmed shrub or small tree with narrowly elliptic phyllodes, spikes of yellow flowers and leathery or crusty, narrowly oblong pods.

== Description ==
Acacia corusca is a rounded, multi-stemmed shrub or small tree that typically grows to a height of 1.5–5 m (4 ft 11 in – 16 ft 5 in) and has smooth grey bark that is fissured and fibrous near the base of mature stems, and has sticky new shoots. Its phyllodes are ascending to erect, straight or curved, narrowly elliptic, usually 38–73 mm (1.5–2.9 in) long and 4–9 mm (0.16–0.35 in) wide with a gland 3–13 mm (0.12–0.51 in) above the base of the phyllodes. The flowers are yellow, and borne in spikes 10–25 mm (0.39–0.98 in) long on peduncles 2–6 mm (0.079–0.236 in) long. Flowering occurs from April to August, and the pods are leathery or crusty, straight and flat, 17–58 mm (0.67–2.28 in) long and 2.7–5 mm (0.11–0.20 in) wide and scarcely raised over the seeds with white hairs pressed against the surface. The seeds are oblong, mostly 3.5–5.5 mm (0.14–0.22 in) long and 1.8–3.1 mm (0.071–0.122 in) wide and brown with a creamy white aril on the end.

== Taxonomy ==
Acacia corusca was first formally described in 2019 by Jerome Bull, Stephen Dillon and Darren Brearley in the journal Nuytsia from specimens collected about 35 km (22 mi) east-north-east of Newman in 2014. The specific epithet (corusca) means 'to flash, glitter or shimmer' referring to the shimmering effect of the dark green foliage on windy days.

== Distribution and habitat ==
Shimmer wattle occurs east-north-east of Newman where it grows in sandy-loam soils on hill crests, ridges and drainage lines in three populations occupying an area of about 8.1 ha (20 acres).

== Conservation status ==
Acacia corusca is listed as "Priority One" by the Government of Western Australia Department of Biodiversity, Conservation and Attractions, meaning that it is known from only one or a few locations where it is potentially at risk.

== See also ==
- List of Acacia species
