= Hickman crater =

Impact crater in Western Australia

- Location within Western Australia
- Location: Ophthalmia Range, Western Australia, Australia; 23°2′13.4″S 119°40′59.3″E

Impact crater structure
- Confidence: Confirmed
- Diameter: 260 m (850 ft)
- Depth: 30 m (98 ft)
- Age: 10–100 ka Pleistocene
- Exposed: Yes
- Drilled: Yes
- Bolide type: 10–15 m (33–49 ft)

The Hickman crater is a recently discovered meteorite impact crater, 16 kilometres northeast of the Hope Downs 4 Mine and 35 kilometres north of Newman in the Ophthalmia Range, Western Australia. It was discovered by Arthur Hickman, a government geologist with the Geological Survey of Western Australia, in July 2007. The discovery was made by chance while browsing Google Earth. A 2012 government scientific drilling project in the centre of the crater confirmed in 2017 the impact of an iron-nickel meteorite.

== Description ==
The crater is about 260 metres (853 ft) wide and 30 metres (98 ft) deep, and is thought to be between 10,000 and 100,000 years old. New research suggests it may be around 50,000 years.

Elevated levels of siderophiles in the structure such as iridium and palladium have been found. It is estimated that the meteorite was between 10 and 15 metres (33 and 49 ft) in diameter when it impacted the ground.

In 2012 the Geological Survey of Western Australia (GSWA) ran a drilling project in collaboration with Atlas Iron, the findings from which were presented at a Geoscience Research workshop in November 2017. The findings are summarised on the Department of Mines, Industry Regulation and Safety (DMIRS) website, and include the following quote: "The 65 metre deep drillhole found that the centre of the crater is filled in by about 48 metres of sediment that was washed in after the crater formed. Below this is a nearly seven metre thick layer of finely smashed up and melted rock that formed the original crater floor, underlain by fractured bedrock. Chemical analysis of the smashed up and melted rock shows, besides comprising fragments of bedrock, it also contains traces of material from an iron meteorite. The internal structure of the crater is similar to that found at other small meteorite impact craters drilled overseas and confirms that the crater was produced by a meteorite impact."
