= Munjina Airstrip =

Former airstrip in Karijini National Park, Western Australia

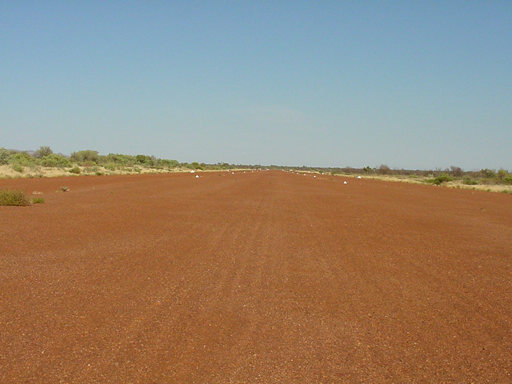
- Runway of Munjina Airstrip, taken between 1997–2002.
- IATA: none; ICAO: YMUJ

Summary
- Airport type: Defunct
- Owner: Department for Planning and Infrastructure
- Location: Karijini National Park in Western Australia
- Opened: March 15, 1996
- Closed: 2010
- Coordinates: 22°21′53.14″S 118°40′55.75″E

Map
- Location in Western Australia

Runways
Direction	Length		Surface
Direction	ft	m	Surface
12/30	1,320	4,330	Dirt

Munjina Airstrip (ICAO: YMUJ) was an emergency airstrip located near the Auski Tourist Village, the corner of the Great Northern Highway and Munjina Road in Karijini National Park, Western Australia. Originally built to replace the asbestos-contaminated airport in Wittenoom, the airstrip served tourist interests and operated as an emergency stop for the Royal Flying Doctor Service (RFDS). Although it was built to replace a former airport, it was closed in 2010 following insufficient use.

== History ==
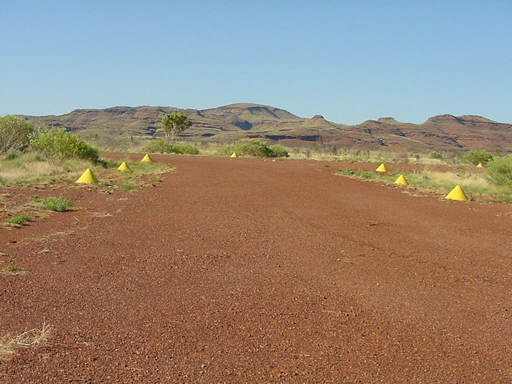
The small apron of Munjina Airstrip, taken between 1997–2002.

Local communities in the Pilbara region were once served by Wittenoom Gorge Airport. After it closed in 1993 due to its association to asbestos contamination, there were no Royal Flying Doctor Service links to the area. Subsequently, the construction of Munjina Airstrip commenced in early 1996, located directly adjacent to the future Auski Tourist Village. The Government of Western Australia provided $250,000 for its construction, which was also used to improve roads in the vicinity of Karijini National Park. It featured a modest, 1,320 metres (4,330 ft) long and 45 metres (148 ft) wide unsealed airstrip. The runway had a maximum weight-bearing capacity of 5,700 kilograms. Additionally, the airstrip was fitted with a navigation aid organised by the Department of Transport, with construction coordinated by Main Roads Pilbara. On 14 March, the emergency night lighting was successfully trialled by a RFDS aircraft from Port Hedland.

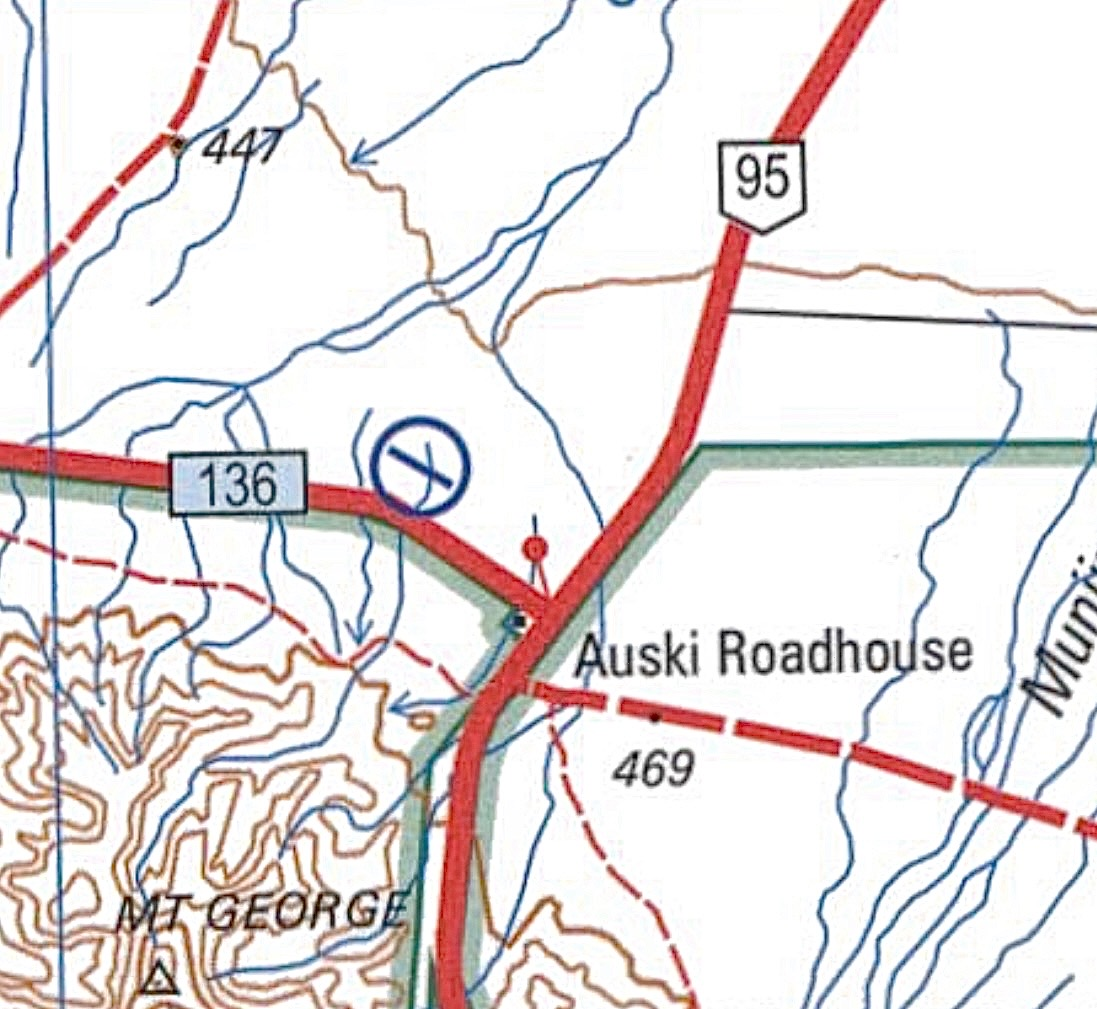
Auski Roadhouse and its counterpart Munjina Airstrip featured in a 1:250,000 topographic map of Royhill (SF50-12), Western Australia.

On 15 March 1996, Munjina Airstrip was officially completed and opened for public use. On 9 October 1996, the Auski Tourist Village was opened by Regional Development Minister Hendy Cowan, aimed at catering for the growing number of visitors at Karijini National Park. Visitor numbers had risen from 39,000 in 1991-92, doubling to almost 65,000 by 1994-95. The village included a caravan park, roadhouse, and 20 motel rooms developed by Auski Holdings Ltd. Munjina Airstrip would be used to facilitate tourist flights over the park.

=== Closure ===
Due to the high maintenance costs and liability of ownership, the Shire of Ashburton sought to decommission the facility. During an Ordinary Meeting of Council held on 17 March 2010, it was established that Munjina Airstrip was not used by local pastoralists and the Auski Roadhouse for its intended purposes. Furthermore, the council's emergency services coordinator did not object to the closure of the strip. Afterwards, Munjina Airstrip was closed for use and maintenance ceased. Despite closure, the 2010-2011 Regional Airports Development Scheme allocated $350,000 to the maintenance and re-sheeting of the airstrip.

Beginning in 2011, Munjina Airstrip was used by the Department of Parks and Wildlife's Fortescue Marsh Feral Cat Baiting Program. Every year, thousands of baits were transported to the airstrip via a "Western Shield" bait truck. On 24 June 2014, 45,950 frozen baits were brought to the strip. Racks were established to expose the baits in direct sunlight, allowing oils and lipid-soluble digest material to exude. Once thawed, this would attract feral cats. In 2016, operations were permanently relocated to Karijini National Park Airstrip as a result of the airstrip's diminished maintenance.

In June 2023, the Ashburton Aboriginal Corporation (AAC) proposed a renewable ten-year lease on the former Munjina Airstrip and its adjacent land, located on Crown land managed by the Department of Planning, Lands and Heritage. The AAC intended to use the airstrip as an airport, helicopter landing facility and lay down storage site serving tourist interests. Estimated to cost about $500,000, planned upgrades included the gravelling and extending of the runway length by 400-450 metres and width to 90 metres.

== See also ==
- List of airports in Western Australia
- Wittenoom Gorge Airport
