= Juna Downs =

Pastoral lease in Western Australia

Coordinates: 22.8853°S 118.4872°E

Location in Western Australia

Juna Downs Station, often referred to as Juna, is a pastoral lease that operates as a cattle station.

It is located about 75 kilometres (47 mi) east of Tom Price and 140 kilometres (87 mi) north west of Newman in the Pilbara region of Western Australia. The station's western boundary abuts Karijini National Park, and access to Western Australia's highest point, Mount Meharry, is through the boundaries of the station.

The mining company Hamersley Iron, a part of Rio Tinto, currently owns Juna. Rio Tinto owns another five stations in the Pilbara, including Yarraloola, Hamersley and Rocklea. Collectively the properties run a herd of approximately 24,000 cattle.

The Panyjima people are the traditional owners of the area in which Juna Downs is located. The last Aboriginal person to live or work on the property left in the 1960s.

The lessee of the property in 1983 was Matt Herbert. The Herbert family later sold the property to Rio Tinto.

== See also ==
- List of ranches and stations
