= Mandara people (Australia) =

Indigenous Australian people

The Mandara were an indigenous Australian people of the Pilbara region of Western Australia. They are extinct, having been absorbed into neighbouring peoples, and their language is unrecorded.

== Country ==
According to Norman Tindale, the Mandara's tribal lands extended over some 1,500 square miles (3,900 km^{2}). Compared to other highlander tribes in this area of the Puilbara, the Mandara were small in numbers, and were concentrated in parts of the Ophthalmia Range and the plateau area lying at the head of the Turee and Weediwolli creeks. Their southern confines touched Prairie Downs.

== History ==
The Mandara were driven off their native grounds by a Völkerwanderung, or tribal migration phase in northwestern Australia that took place shortly before actually contact with Europeans occurred, in which the Kurrama pressured the Panyjima, who in turn moved southeast to exert pressure on tribes like the Mandara. The Mandara were compelled to shift north towards the Fortescue River, but eventually their remnants were absorbed by the Panyjima and the Niabali, who had been similarly affected.

== Sources ==
- "AIATSIS map of Indigenous Australia". AIATSIS.
- "Tindale Tribal Boundaries" (PDF). Department of Aboriginal Affairs, Western Australia. September 2016. Archived from the original (PDF) on 8 March 2016.
- Tindale, Norman Barnett (1974). "Mandara (WA)". Aboriginal Tribes of Australia: Their Terrain, Environmental Controls, Distribution, Limits, and Proper Names. Australian National University. ISBN 978-0-708-10741-6. Archived from the original on 20 March 2020.
