= Angelo River =

River in Western Australia

Coordinates: 23°42′30″S 117°44′48″E

Location
- Country: Australia

Physical characteristics
- Source
  - location: Ophthalmia Range
  - elevation: 922 metres (3,025 ft)
- Mouth
  - location: Ashburton River
  - elevation: 297 metres (974 ft)
- Length: 202 km (126 mi)

The Angelo River is a river in the Pilbara region of Western Australia.

The river rises in the hills to the western side of the Ophthalmia Range and flows in a southerly direction before veering east near Kundering Range and past the Angelo River Mine and Angelo River prospect, a uranium deposit, then finally discharging into the Ashburton River.

The river has six tributaries, including Indabiddy Creek, Bukardi Creek and Kennedy Creek.

The river was named in 1887 by Robert McPhee, who was prospecting the area at the time. He named the river after Colonel Fox Angelo, who was the government resident in Roebourne and later became the Superintendent of Rottnest Island.

Aboriginal Australians, the Ngarlawongga and Banjima peoples, have dreamtime songs involving the origin of the black river goanna, which is believed to have been created in the river. Likewise the black-headed python is believed to have been created in Indabiddy Creek.
