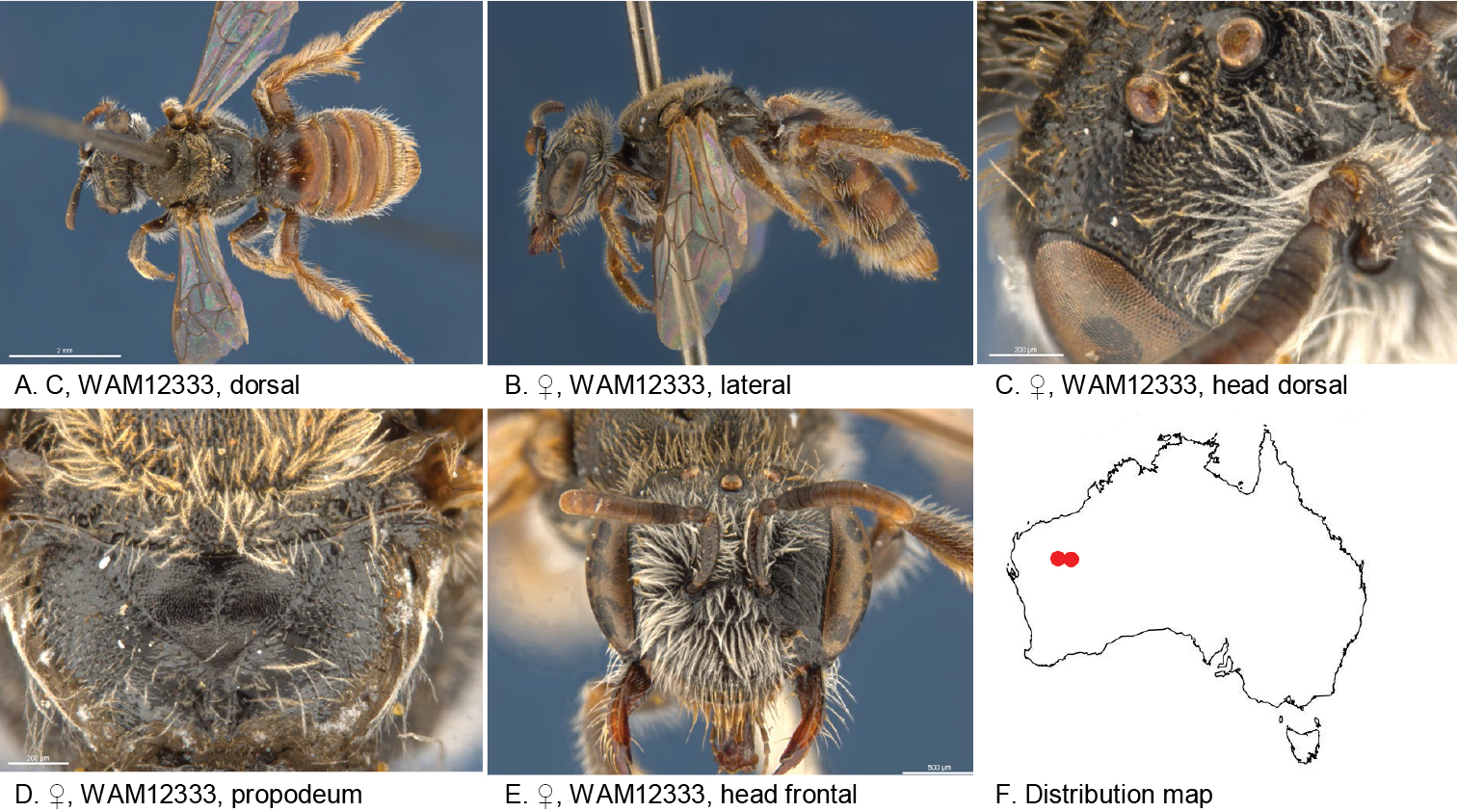
- Female holotype

Scientific classification
- Kingdom: Animalia
- Phylum: Arthropoda
- Clade: Pancrustacea
- Class: Insecta
- Order: Hymenoptera
- Family: Colletidae
- Genus: Leioproctus
- Species: L. pectinatus

Binomial name
- Leioproctus pectinatus Leijs 2018

= Leioproctus pectinatus =

Species of bee

Leioproctus pectinatus, or Leioproctus (Colletellus) pectinatus, is a species of bee in the family Colletidae and subfamily Colletinae. It is endemic to Australia. It was described by entomologist Remko Leijs in 2018.

== Etymology ==
The specific epithet pectinatus refers to the strongly pectinate inner hind tibial spur.

== Description ==
The female holotype body length is 6.7 mm, head width 1.9 mm. Integumental colouration is mainly black, orange and brown. The hair is white to orange.

== Distribution and habitat ==
The species occurs in Western Australia. The type locality is 25 km south-west of Tangadee, in the Mid West region.

== Behaviour ==
The adults are flying mellivores. Flowering plants visited by the bees include Calandrinia species.
