= Ethel Creek Station =

Pastoral lease in Western Australia

Coordinates: 22.898°S 120.167°E

Location in Western Australia

Ethel Creek Station is a pastoral lease that operates as a cattle station.

It is located about 68 kilometres (42 mi) north east of Newman and 111 kilometres (69 mi) south of Nullagine in the Pilbara region of Western Australia. It had about 100 miles (161 km) double frontage to the Fortescue River and adjoins Roy Hill, Balfour Downs, Three Rivers, Muura Munda and Sylvania Stations. The country is mostly alluvial flats that support a variety of grasses.

The station was established in about 1880 by Charles Smith. A new stock route passed through the area in 1895.

Jack Bates, the drover husband of Daisy Bates, acquired Ethel Creek at some time before 1902. The Bates family, including the 15-year-old Arnold Bates, bought cattle at Roebuck Plains, near Broome and overlanded the 770 head of Hereford cattle for over 1,000 kilometres (621 mi) back to Ethel Creek. The journey took about six months and although they lost 200 head along the way they still made a profit of over 1,000. The Bates' were legally separated in 1912.

Messrs J and L Smith acquired the property in about 1902 and placed it on the market in 1928. At this time Ethel Creek comprised 971,987 acres (393,349 ha) of land with a carrying capacity of either 17,000 cattle or 120,000 sheep. In addition to the many pools along the Fortescue River stock were watered by 38 wells that were fully equipped with engines, mills and troughing. The property had over 30 miles (48 km) of fencing dividing it into nine paddocks. A six-room homestead, with additional workers cottages, a post office, store and two outcamps were included along the buildings on Ethel Creek. During the 1970s until the late 1980s the property was run by Rex Ericson and his wife Olga and their children Michael, Brett, Craig and Tanya. Tanya died during transit, as a result of a motor vehicle accident at age 14, on the property and is buried in the station cemetery. Olga was also buried at the Ethel creek cemetery in 2010, at her request to be beside her beloved daughter. Rex Ericson found himself named in the Stockman's Hall of Fame, for the era in which had run, not only the large station of Ethel Creek but Roy Hill, Balfour Downs and Marillana. The largest land title under one management recorded in Western Australia. The family moved to neighbouring Mount Divide station in the late 1980s.

Since 1989 the property has been managed by Barry and Bella Gratte, who were running 5,000 head of droughtmaster and shorthorn cross-bred cattle.

BHP currently owns the property which is run in conjunction with Marillana Station, together the two properties have a combined area of 7,500 square kilometres (2,896 sq mi).

== See also ==
- List of ranches and stations
