= Mount Vernon Station (Western Australia) =

Pastoral lease in Western Australia

Coordinates: 24.2291912°S 118.2404717°E

Location in Western Australia

Mount Vernon Station is a pastoral lease that operates as a cattle station.

It is located about 194 kilometres (121 mi) south west of Newman and 275 kilometres (171 mi) north of Meekatharra in the Mid West region of Western Australia. The Ashburton River runs through the property for a distance of approximately 150 kilometres (93 mi) from east to west and the Ethel River runs through the southern portion. Mount Vernon has common boundaries with Bulloo Downs, Tangadee, Pingandy, Mininer and Turee Creek Stations as well as vacant crown land.

The property occupies an area of 4,047 square kilometres (1,563 sq mi). The country varies from the alluvial plains flanking the river that support various native grasses to the rugged mountain and dolomite hills that support tall shrubland and spinifex plains. It has an estimated carrying capacity of 4,150 cattle and in 1979 was carrying 1,200 head of cattle.

In 1928 Mount Vernon was put up for auction, at this time it occupied an area of 614,380 acres (248,631 ha) and was stocked with 900 cattle and 150 horses.

The station had been acquired by J. A. and C. Meehan who held the lease until selling the property for £18,000 in 1951. The Panizza family, a well known pastoralist family from Dardanup, had bought the property.

In 2006 Mount Vernon had flooding resulting from heavy rains in 1997; the next good season the property had was in 2006 when it recorded 425.8 millimetres (17 in), 183 millimetres (7 in) above its yearly average.

A light plane crash at the property in 2006 killed a 26-year-old station hand and a toddler.

== See also ==
- List of ranches and stations
