= Mount Bruce (Western Australia) =

Mountain in Western Australia

- Panyjima: Punurrunha
- Location within Western Australia

Highest point
- Elevation: 1,234 m (4,049 ft)
- Coordinates: 22°34′05″S 118°04′34″E

Geography
- Location: Pilbara region, Western Australia
- Parent range: Hamersley Range

Mount Bruce (Panyjima:Punurrunha) is the second highest mountain in the state of Western Australia.

Mount Bruce lies 62 kilometres (39 mi) northwest of Mount Meharry, the highest peak in the state. It is a part of the Hamersley Range in the Pilbara. A number of walks exist on the mountain including the relatively easy Marandoo walk that offers a view over the Marandoo minesite, the more difficult Honey Hakea walk and the summit track.

Mount Bruce reaches 1,234 metres (4,049 ft), being 15 metres (49 ft) lower than Mount Meharry.
