= Tangadee =

Pastoral lease in Western Australia

Coordinates: 24.411°S 118.943°E

Location in Western Australia

Tangadee Station, often referred to as Tangadee, is a pastoral lease that operates as a cattle station.

It is located about 140 kilometres (87 mi) south of Newman and 200 kilometres (124 mi) north of Meekatharra in the Mid West region of Western Australia.

Tangadee occupies an area of 1,864 square kilometres (720 sq mi) and shares boundaries with Mount Vernon, Bulloo Downs and Mulgul Stations as well as vacant crown land.

Tangadee station was purchased in 1982 by Richard and Joan Day and is currently operated by son Barkley and grandsons Clayton and Ryan Day.

== See also ==
- List of ranches and stations
