= Wittenoom Gorge Airport =

Former airfield in Wittenoom Contaminated Site

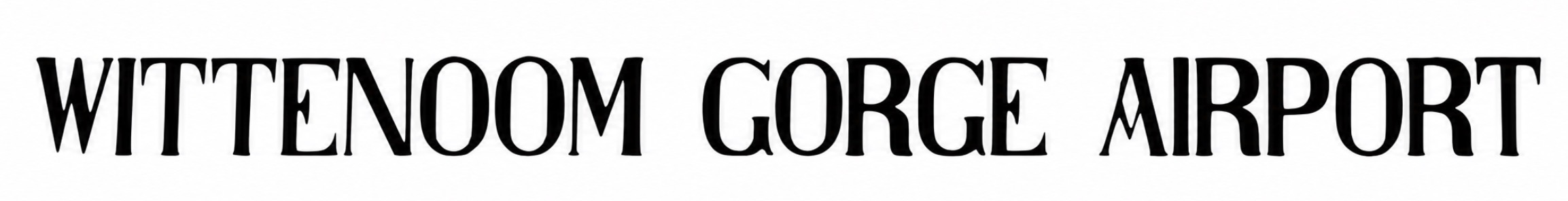

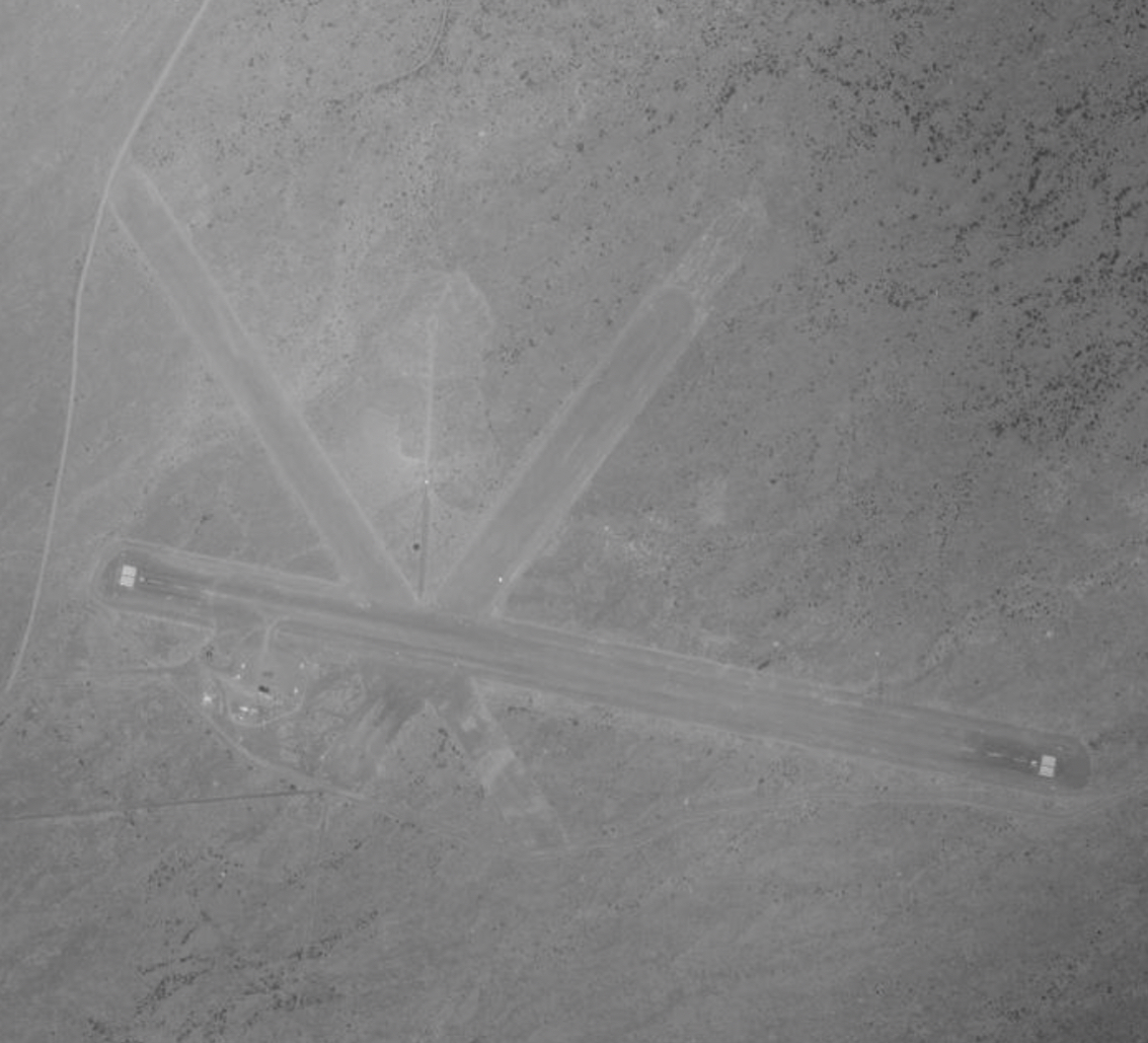
- Aerial photo of Wittenoom Gorge Airport taken on 22 September 1973.
- IATA: WIT; ICAO: ~~YWIT~~

Summary
- Airport type: Closed
- Owner/Operator: Department of Civil Aviation
- Serves: Wittenoom, Western Australia
- Location: Wittenoom Contaminated Site
- Opened: 1944; 82 years ago
- Closed: November 1993
- Coordinates: 22°13′35″S 118°21′41″E

Map
- Location in Western Australia

Runways
Direction	Length		Surface
Direction	ft	m	Surface
~~09/27~~	~~7,198~~	~~2,194~~	~~Asbestos tailings/Gravel~~
~~15/33~~	~~5,540~~	~~1,689~~	~~Dirt~~

Wittenoom Gorge Airport ~~(IATA: WIT, ICAO: YWIT)~~ was an airfield located in Wittenoom, Pilbara region of Western Australia. In the 1950s, it played a key role in Wittenoom’s asbestos industry by facilitating the immigration of workers. It was operated by the Department of Civil Aviation, and was closed in 1993.

== History ==
In 1944, Wittenoom Gorge Airport was established with three landing strips for operations by the Blue Asbestos Mining Co. It was designated as Landing Ground No. 811. In March 1945, the airfield was rated “A” class in favour of winds and dry weather by the Department of Civil Aviation (DCA). On 28 August 1947, Airlines (W.A.) Ltd. opened a regular a service to Wittenoom, with £3/10/ for single and £6/4/ return. The service extended the Perth-Meekatharra route to Wittenoom Gorge and onward towards Roebourne. On June 3, 1947, an air migration of 1000 workers to the town begun, where they would work in the Australian Blue Abestos Ltd. Aircraft operated by Airlines (W.A.) Ltd. were chartered to facilitate this operation. On July 1947, an air service which would carry mail, passenger, freight, and medical facilities was opened to Wittenoom Gorge Airport by MacRobertson Miller Airlines from Port Hedland. These flights help facilitate the transportation of workers and supplies to the asbestos mining industry.

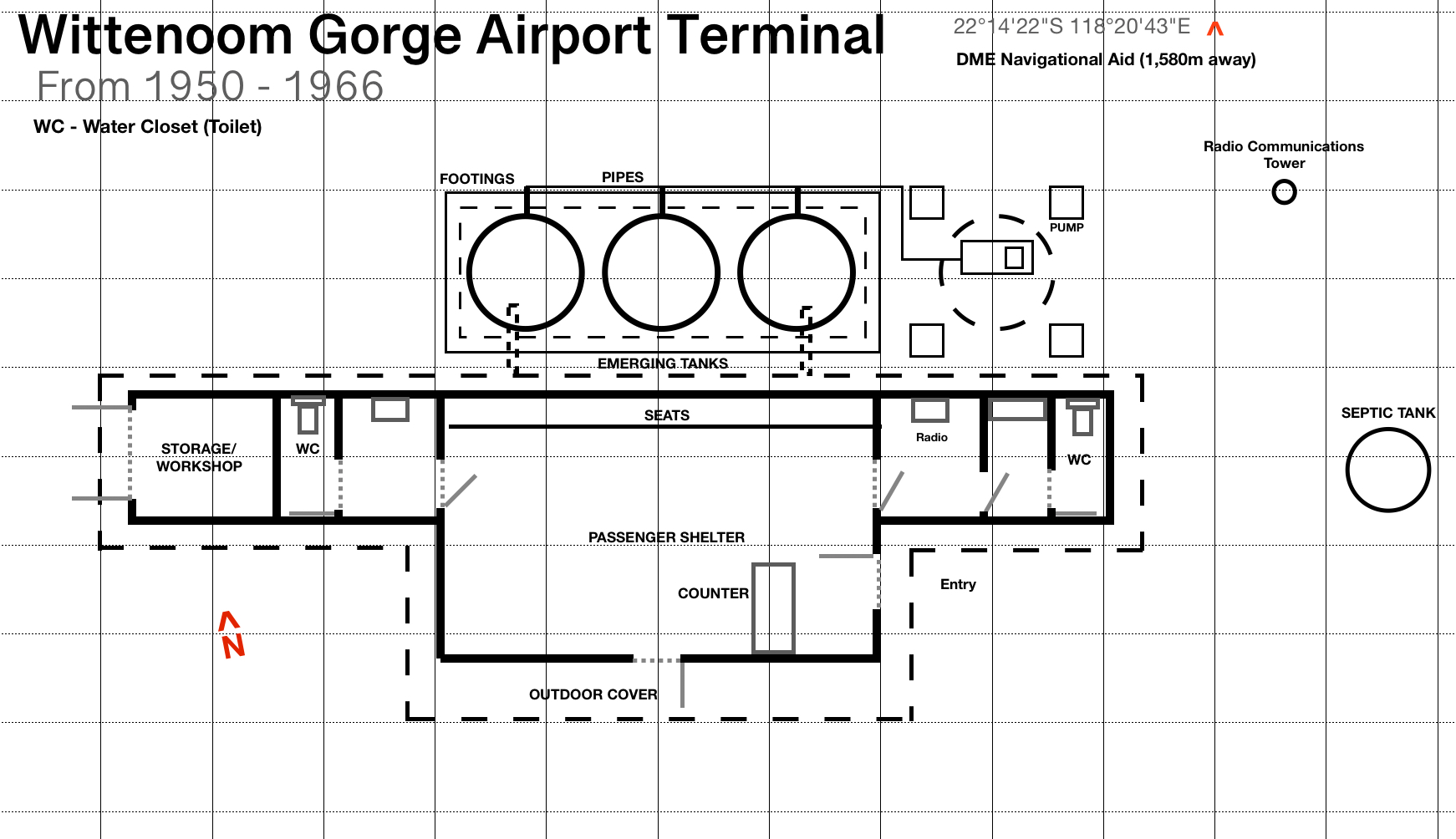
A labeled diagram of Wittenoom Gorge’s terminal that includes nearby structures relating to the airport.

On 22 January 1952, heavy rain rendered the airport unserviceable, which canceled a special Anson aircraft of Airlines (W.A.) Ltd.’s scheduled service. In November 1954, increasing air traffic at Wittenoom Gorge Airport prompted the expansion of the runways. This mainly included the lengthening and widening of existing runways, and the grading and consolidation of the runway surface. In 1955, runway 15/33 (5540 ft long) dirt strip was closed while two other runways were being used. The runway was paved with tailings, which contained about 5% asbestos. In 1958, the Department of Works constructed an airport terminal, which consisted of a passenger shelter with seating and a desk. There were also two toilets and a workshop. On the backside, there were three emerging tanks, a pump, and a 1,000 gallon water tank. Near the terminal was an equipment building. In 1962, an airport powerhouse was installed by the Department of Civil Aviation. This included a site preparation access road, and associated pavements and engineering services.

In 1964, an aerodrome information service was established at Wittenoom Gorge Airport. In 1964-65, the DCA approved the installation of night landing facilities at the airport. It was equipped with permanent low intensity runway and taxiway lighting, and also necessary navigational facilities for night operations. By the 1970s, Wittenoom Gorge Airport later operated a Distance Measuring Equipment (DME) tower for the Department of Civil Aviation. The tower was also used by Telecom for providing links to telephones in the town prior to the construction of a new tower located at the Eastern edge of the town.

=== Abandonment ===
==== Prelude ====
By the 1990s, several essentials services operating in the town began winding down. Despite the closures, the Royal Flying Doctor Service continued using Wittenoom Gorge Airport as a major evacuation point for the Karijini National Park. With more than 50,000 annual visitors at the time, the airport was used in case for potential, serious accidents. The Department of Transport and Communications was to surrender lease of the airport by the beginning of October, largely due to the environmental risks associated with continuing operations. In September 1993, Deputy Premier Hendy Cowan sent a letter to the department to delay the closure of the airport, stating that it remain open until inquiries concerning Wittenoom's future were completed. Regardless of the request, Wittenoom Gorge Airport and its access roads were officially closed in November 1993.

==== Closure ====
Afterwards, white "X" markers were installed on the runway to indicate closure. In 1996, several buildings in the town were demolished, and the materials were subsequently buried in the former airport grounds. In March 1996, construction of Munjina Airstrip was completed, which could accommodate medium and large aircraft, allowing services including the Royal Flying Doctor Service (RFDS) to operate from the runway. The decision was done after the closure of Wittenoom Gorge Airport isolated remote communities in the Pilbara region from mail and health services. On 14 March, the runway lights were successfully trialed by a RFDS flight from Port Hedland.

In 2006 a risk-assessment and strategy report was made, with plans to isolate Wittenoom Gorge Airport from public access, and stripping the runways to encourage natural growth. In January 2008, the Department of Environment & Conservation designated the airport site as contaminated and unsuitable for human settlement.

== Cemetery ==
Located in the proximity of Wittenoom Gorge Airport, a small cemetery can be found with approximately 8 graves onsite. The burials took place between 1945 and 1951. Today, the cemetery remains neglected with a few wooden crosses that remain.

== Accidents and incidents ==
- On 14 July 1953, an aircraft piloted by L. G. Hancock was en route to Wittenoom during the only time of the year when low cloud and fog covered the aerodrome. To the surprise of members of the local race club, Hancock made use of the racecourse and landed there instead.
- In 1964-65, a Piper PA-39-160 Twin Comanche C/R registered as VH-MED was lost in the Wittenoom area. A six-hour search commenced by SAR aircraft concluded with the successful rescue of the occupant. The aircraft was later repaired and bought on 20 March 1972, by Adelaide interior designer, and aviation enthusiast Langdon Badger. Badger custom-fitted VH-MED with wingtip fuel tanks, and flew searches around remote coastal and bush environments for abandoned wartime wrecks. In August 1998, the aircraft was reregistered as VH-MAB.
