= Prairie Downs =

Pastoral lease in Western Australia

Coordinates: 23.553°S 119.148°E

Location in Western Australia

Prairie Downs Station, often referred to as Prairie Downs, is a pastoral lease that operates as a cattle station.

It is located about 63 kilometres (39 mi) south west of Newman and 130 kilometres (81 mi) south east of Paraburdoo in the Mid West region of Western Australia.

Prairie Downs occupies an area of 2,274 square kilometres (878 sq mi) and shares boundaries with Turee Creek Station, Bulloo Downs, Sylvania and Ethel Creek Stations as well as vacant crown land.

The property was owned by Albert Leake in 1932. Leake still owned the property when he died in 1947 at 82 years of age. The Department of Lands advertised the 169,721-acre (68,684 ha) property in 1948 as being available for leasing.

An estimated 20,000 feral donkeys were roaming on Prairie Downs and neighbouring Bulloo Downs Stations in 1957.

In 1979 the property was running 877 cattle but is capable of carrying 2,590 cattle during a good season.

== See also ==
- List of pastoral leases in Western Australia
