= Turee Creek Station =

Pastoral lease in Western Australia

Coordinates: 23.624°S 118.657°E

Location in Western Australia

Turee Creek Station, often referred to as Turee Creek and also known as Turee Station, is a pastoral lease that operates as a cattle station.

It is located about 110 kilometres (68 mi) south east of Paraburdoo and 140 kilometres (87 mi) south west of Newman in the Pilbara region of Western Australia.

Turee Creek occupies an area of 2,777 square kilometres (1,072 sq mi) and shares boundaries with Mount Vernon, Mininer, Prairie Downs, Rocklea and Juna Downs Stations as well as the vacant crown land. The station is split into two blocks separated by crown land. The homestead is situated on the southern block. This block consists of the broad alluvial plains of Turee Creek flanked by hardpan plains. The northern block is made up of a narrow river valley flanked by jagged hills and undulating plains.

The station was owned in 1932 by Piesse and Maguire, who were trading in bullocks to the sale yards in Meekatharra.

In 1979 the property was stocked with 1,522 head of cattle and was estimated to be able to support 3,050 head in a good season.

In 2003 the property was owned and managed by Bruce and Suzanne Maguire and was running a herd of 3,700 cattle. Tourists are able to visit the property as part of the Outback Mail Tour where Polar Aviation, the mail contractors, are able to take tourists along when they complete their deliveries once a week.

Bushfires swept through the area in 2006, with over 12,000 hectares (29,653 acres) of rangeland being burnt out at Turee Creek and Prairie Downs Stations.

== See also ==
- List of ranches and stations
