= Jurruru language =

Extinct Australian Aboriginal language

Jurruru
- Region: Pilbara, Western Australia
- Ethnicity: Tjuroro people
- Extinct: by 1986
- Language family: Pama–Nyungan: Ngayarta; Jurruru

Language codes
- ISO 639-3: tju
- Glottolog: tjur1240
- AIATSIS: W33
- ELP: Jurruru

Jurruru is an extinct Australian Aboriginal language formerly spoken in the Pilbara region of Western Australia, particularly near the Ashburton River. It is classified as part of the Pama–Nyungan language family, within the Ngayarda subgroup. There were two speakers left in 1967 and no speakers by 1986, leading to its extinction.

== Grammar ==
Jurruru exhibits a nominative–accusative alignment system, characteristic of the Ngayarda languages to its north. This differs from the split-ergative nominal morphology found in the Kanyara and Mantharta languages. In Jurruru, the accusative case is marked by the suffix -ku, contrasting with -nha in Mantharta and Kanyara. The allative case is marked by -karta, distinct from -kurla/-rla in Mantharta and -pura/-kurrunu in Kanyara. The ablative case is marked by -nguru, similar to one of the two ablatives used in Jiwarli, but unlike the -parnti form seen in Kanyara and Mantharta. Unlike the southern groups, Jurruru marks transitive object noun phrases consistently with the accusative -ku regardless of clause type. In Mantharta and Kanyara, object marking can vary depending on syntactic context, such as purpose or relative clauses.

=== Pronouns ===
Jurruru's pronominal system aligns more closely with other Ngayarda languages, particularly Panyjima, than with the Mantharta group. The first-person singular accusative/genitive case nganaju appears to be a cognate with forms in Jiwarli and Warriyangka, though its function varies across groups. Jurruru does not distinguish inclusive vs. exclusive forms in the first-person non-singular pronouns, a trait also found in the Kanyara language Payungu but not in Mantharta. Jurruru's plural pronouns may exhibit final long vowels (e.g., -kuu), possibly deriving from earlier -kuru forms via loss of r.

=== Verbal morphology ===
Jurruru has a relatively simple verbal inflection system, consisting of two conjugation classes. This aligns with its northern Ngayarda neighbors and differs from the more complex systems found in the Mantharta and Kanyara languages. Its verb roots reflect the old present-tense form (e.g., manku- "take", yanku- "go", yungku- "give", ngalku- "eat"), a feature shared across most Ngayarda languages except Palyku, Panyjima, Ngarla, and Nyamal. By contrast, cognate verbs in Mantharta languages appear as mana- and yana- for "take" and "go," respectively.

== Bibliography ==
- Austin, Peter (1988). "Classification of Southern Pilbara languages". In Dunn, L.; Geytenbeek, H.; Glasgow, K.; McGregor, W.; Oates, L.; Swartz, S. (eds.). Papers in Australian Linguistics, no. 17 (PDF). Canberra: Pacific Linguistics. pp. 1–17, PL A-71. doi:10.15144/PL-A71.1. "Online edition licensed 2015 CC BY-SA 4.0, with permission of PL"
- Dench, Alan Charles (1995). Martuthunira: a language of the Pilbara region of Western Australia. Pacific linguistics Series C, Books. Canberra: Dep. of Linguistics, Research School of Pacific and Asian Studies, Australian National Univ. ISBN 978-0-85883-422-4.
- Thieberger, Nicholas (1993). "Jurruru". Handbook of Western Australian Aboriginal Languages South of the Kimberley Region. Pacific Linguistics.
