= Marillana =

Pastoral lease in Western Australia

Coordinates: 22°38.106′S 119°24.312′E

Location in Western Australia

Marillana Station, often referred to as Marillana, is a pastoral lease that operates as a cattle station but has previously operated as a sheep station.

BHP currently own the property, which is run in conjunction with Ethel Creek Station; together the two properties have a combined area of 7,500 square kilometres (2,896 sq mi).

The Marillana Pastoral Company was established in 1920.

In 1949 approximately 15,000 sheep were shorn to produce 336 bales of wool.

Alex L. Spring was the part owner and station manager of both Marillana and Roy Hill Stations in 1952 when he started to use road trains to transport cattle to Meekatharra.

== See also ==
- List of ranches and stations
