= Tjuroro people =

The Tjuroro, also known as the Jurruru, were an Aboriginal Australian people of the Pilbara region of Western Australia.

== Name ==
The Tjuroro ethnonym appears to have meant 'lowlanders', in opposition to the Kurama (uplanders).

== Language ==
The Tjuroro spoke Jurruru.

== Country ==
The group's territory covered 2,200 square miles (5,700 km^{2}) along and southeast of the Ashburton River from Kooline to Ashburton Downs and Turee Creek junction. Their northern extension went as far as the slopes overlooking the Pilbara's Hardey River. They also hunted as far north and south as the headwaters of the creeks in the Kenneth and Capricorn Ranges.

== Alternative names ==
- Churoro, Choororo, Chooraroo
- Djururo
- Tjororo, Tjururu, Tjururo

Source: Tindale 1974, p. 257

== Sources ==
- "AIATSIS map of Indigenous Australia". AIATSIS. 14 May 2024.
- Austin, Peter (1988). Aboriginal languages of the Gascoyne-Ashburton region. Vol. 1. La Trobe Working Papers in Linguistics. pp. 43–63.
- "Tindale Tribal Boundaries" (PDF). Department of Aboriginal Affairs, Western Australia. September 2016.
- Tindale, Norman Barnett (1974). "Tjuroro (WA)". Aboriginal Tribes of Australia: Their Terrain, Environmental Controls, Distribution, Limits, and Proper Names. Australian National University. ISBN 978-0-708-10741-6. Archived from the original on 20 March 2020.
