= Mount Bruce (California) =

Mountain in California, United States

Coordinates: 37°35′47″N 119°29′37″W

- Location within California Location within the United States

Geography
- Country: United States
- State: California

Mount Bruce is a summit in Yosemite National Park, United States. With an elevation of 9,724 feet (2,964 m), Mount Bruce is the 626th highest summit in the state of California.

Mount Bruce was named for the Bruce family of pioneer settlers.
