= Wittenoom, Western Australia =

Contaminated site and former town in Pilbara, Western Australia

Wittenoom Ngambigunha
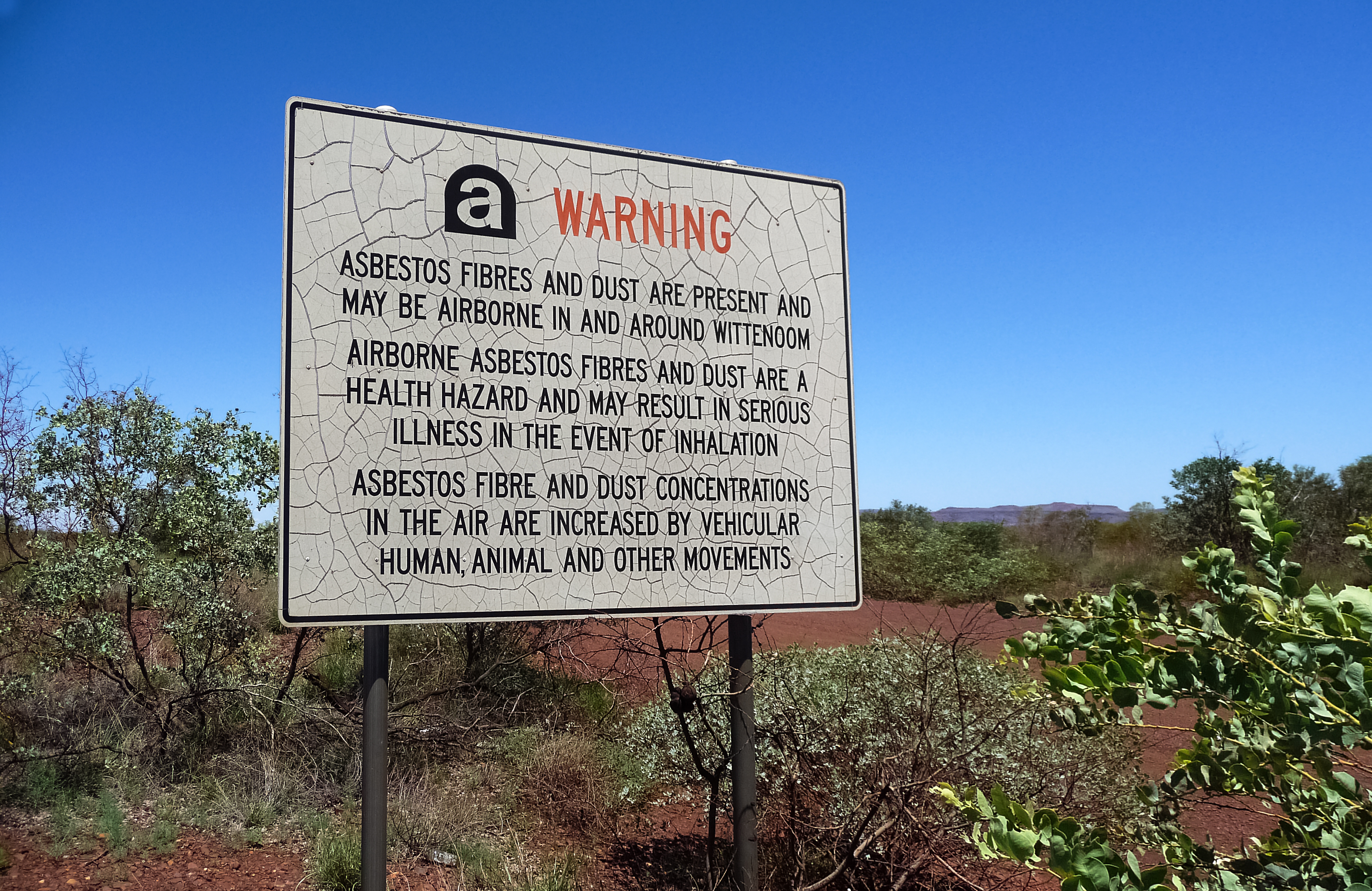
- State government warning sign near the entrance to the former Wittenoom township

- Interactive map of Wittenoom
- Coordinates: 22°14′23″S 118°20′05″E
- Country: Australia
- State: Western Australia
- LGA: Shire of Ashburton
- Location: 140 km (87 mi) from Tom Price
- Established: 1950

Government
  - State electorate: Pilbara
  - Federal division: Durack

Area
  - Total: 353.1 km^{2} (136.3 sq mi)
- Elevation: 463 m (1,519 ft)

Population
  - Total: 0 (SAL 2021)
- Postcode: 6751
- Gazetted: Degazetted June 2007
- Mean max temp: 33.0 °C (91.4 °F)
- Mean min temp: 19.8 °C (67.6 °F)
- Annual rainfall: 457.0 mm (17.99 in)

Wittenoom is a former mining town and a declared contaminated site, 1,420 kilometres (880 mi) north-north-east of Perth, in the Hamersley Range in the Pilbara region of Western Australia. The declared contaminated site comprises 46,840 hectares (115,700 acres), making it the largest contaminated site in the southern hemisphere, an area nearly 1/5 the size of the Chernobyl exclusion zone area. The Government of Western Australia "strongly advises against all travel through Wittenoom and the surrounding areas". (Note: Nanutarra Road, Wittenoom-Munjina Road and Roebourne – Wittenoom Road all in part pass through the asbestos contaminated area.)

The area around Wittenoom was mainly pastoral until the 1940s when mining for blue asbestos began. In 1947, a company town was established and grew to a peak population of 881 in 1961. Following the closure of the mine in 1966, the town declined to just 100 residents by 1979. Amid health concerns about asbestos contamination, a series of decisions by the Western Australian Government resulted in services being removed and the eventual eviction of all remaining residents by 2023.

The Panyjima ("Banjima") Aboriginal Australian people have held exclusive native title over the area surrounding the former town of Wittenoom since 2014, and campaign for the area's clean-up by the government.

== Name ==
The areas is called Ngambigunha in the Banjima language of its traditional owners.

It was given the name Wittenoom by Lang Hancock after Frank Wittenoom, his partner in the nearby Mulga Downs Station. The land around Wittenoom was originally settled by Wittenoom's brother, politician Edward Horne Wittenoom.

By the late 1940s, there were calls for a government townsite near the mine, and the Mines Department recommended it be named Wittenoom, advising that adoption of that name was strongly urged by the local people.

The name was approved in 1948, but it was not until 2 May 1950 that the townsite was officially gazetted. In 1951, the name was changed to Wittenoom Gorge at the request of the mining company but, in 1974, it was changed back to Wittenoom.

The mine closed in 1966, and the official abolition of the town was gazetted in March 2007.

== History ==
=== Early history ===
The area was originally resided on by the Panyjima, also known as the Banjima, an Aboriginal Australian people of the Pilbara region of Western Australia. They hold native title over the area, known by its people as Ngambigunha.

In 1917, the Mines Department first recorded the presence of blue asbestos in the Hamersley Ranges. In the early 1930s, Lang Hancock discovered Wittenoom Gorge, on the Mulga Downs property. In 1937, Hancock showed samples of blue asbestos (crocidolite) that he had picked up in the Gorge to Islwyn "Izzy" Walters and Walter Leonard, who were mining and treating white asbestos at Nunyerrie, and at Lionel near Nullagine. When Hancock learned the fibre would fetch £A 70 per ton, equivalent to A$7,383 per tonne in 2022, he immediately pegged the best claims in Wittenoom Gorge.

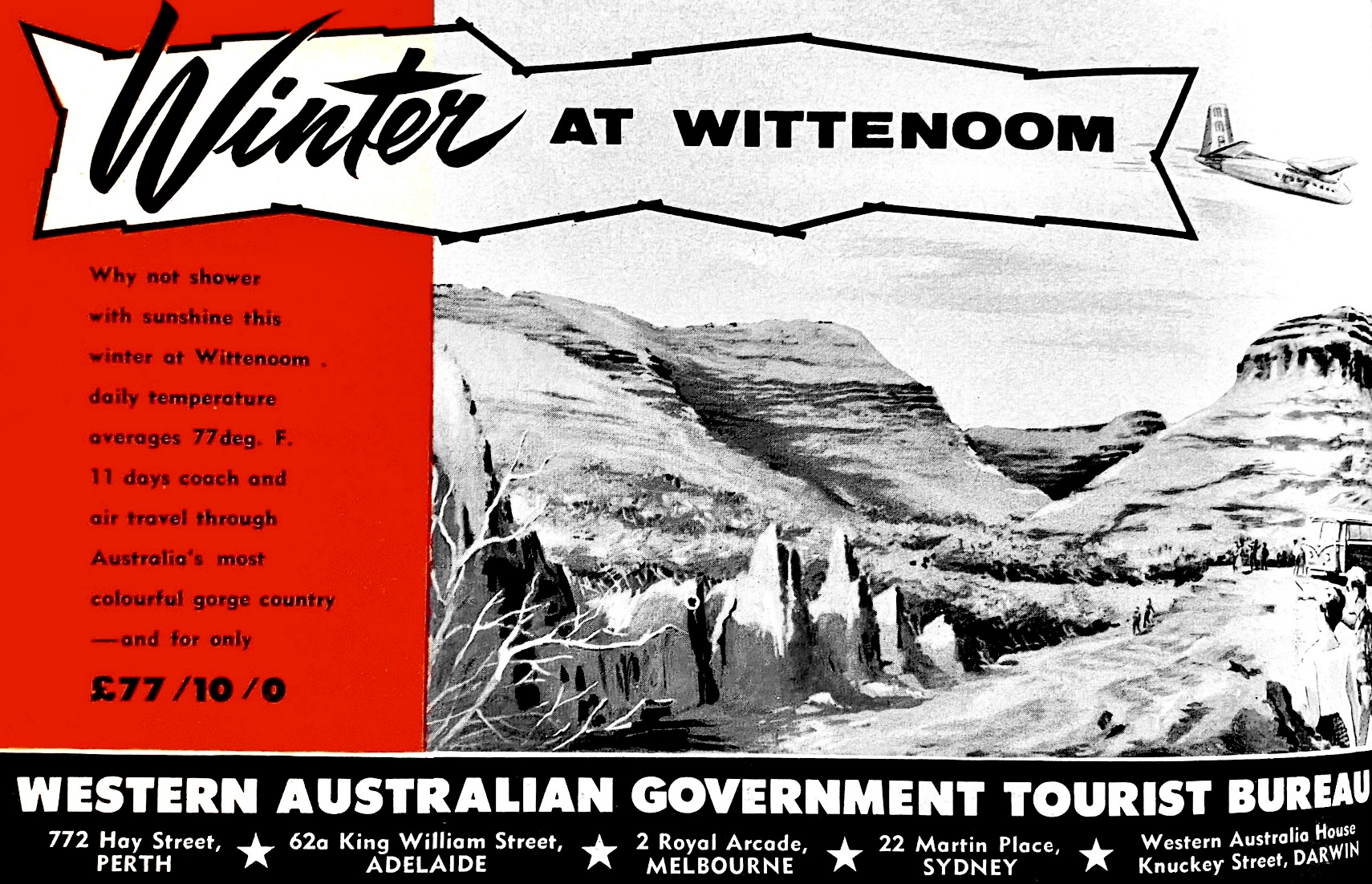
Advertisement by Western Australian Government Tourist Bureau, 1960s

Leo Snell, a kangaroo shooter on Mulga Downs, pegged a claim on Yampire Gorge, where there was a lot more blue asbestos. Walters and Leonard purchased Yampire Gorge from Snell, moved their treatment plant there, and began mining and treating the fibre. When Leonard cabled London that 3.2 kilometres (2 mi) of asbestos were in sight at Yampire Gorge, they cabled him back saying he should take a holiday. Leonard had to send a photograph before it was believed Yampire Gorge contained that much asbestos.

The area around Wittenoom was mainly pastoral until the 1940s when mining for blue asbestos began. Walters and Leonard cleared the way into Yampire Gorge by blasting the biggest rocks and pulling them out of the way with a camel team. They took seven hours to drive their truck the 24 kilometres (15 mi) from the workings to their treatment plant. By 1940, twenty-two men were employed at the Yampire Gorge workings, and about 381 tonnes (840,000 lb) were mined and transported by mule team wagons to the coast at Point Samson. During World War II, communications with England became difficult, and de Berrales acquired an interest in the mines.

=== Asbestos mining ===
By 1941, major mining began in Yampire Gorge, which was closed in 1943 when mining began in Wittenoom Gorge. In 1943, the Colonial Sugar Company, through its subsidiary, Australian Blue Asbestos Ltd., took over both the Wittenoom and Yampire Mines. In 1947, a company town was built and, during the 1950s, it was the Pilbara's largest town. The peak population, as recorded by the Australian census conducted on 30 June 1961, was 881 (601 males and 280 females). During the 1950s and early 1960s, Wittenoom was Australia's only supplier of blue asbestos. The mine was shut down in 1966 due to its unprofitability, and growing health concerns from asbestos mining in the area.

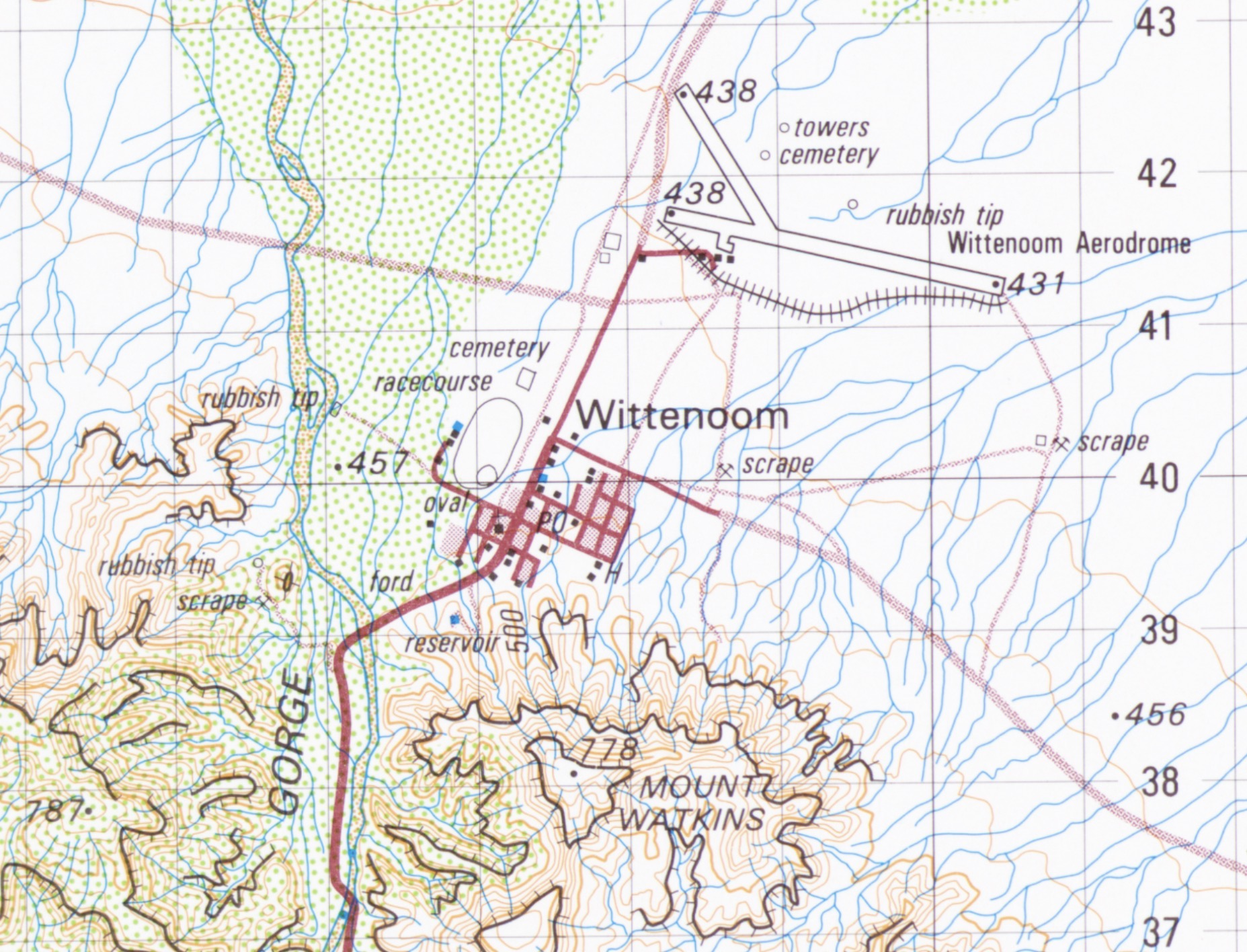
1990 topographic map of Wittenoom

Lang Hancock, who watched his station property transform to a town, stated in 1958: "Izzy Walters was the man who stuck it and produced the market that made Wittenoom of today possible." Walter's partner, Len Leonard, put it this way in 1958: "but for his (Islwyn Walters) sheer grit and hard work there would be no such thing as Wittenoom. We have him to thank for that." Due to a lack of profitability however, the mine at Wittenoom was closed in 1966. As of 2024, more than 2,000 of the approximately 20,000 former mine workers and residents of Wittenoom had died of asbestos-related diseases.

Wittenoom Gorge Airport served as part of the routes that MMA and Airlines (WA) operated on for bringing workers and supplies in and out of the asbestos mine. It later closed due to health concerns, as its runways were made of gravel and asbestos tailings.

=== Closing of the town ===
About 100 people were still living in the town by 1979, despite the State Government proposing to close the town. The former townsite no longer receives government services. In December 2006, the Government of Western Australia announced that the town's official status would be removed and, in June 2007, Jon Ford, the Minister for Regional Development, announced that the townsite had officially been degazetted. The town's name was removed from official maps and road signs, and the Shire of Ashburton is able to close roads that lead to contaminated areas.

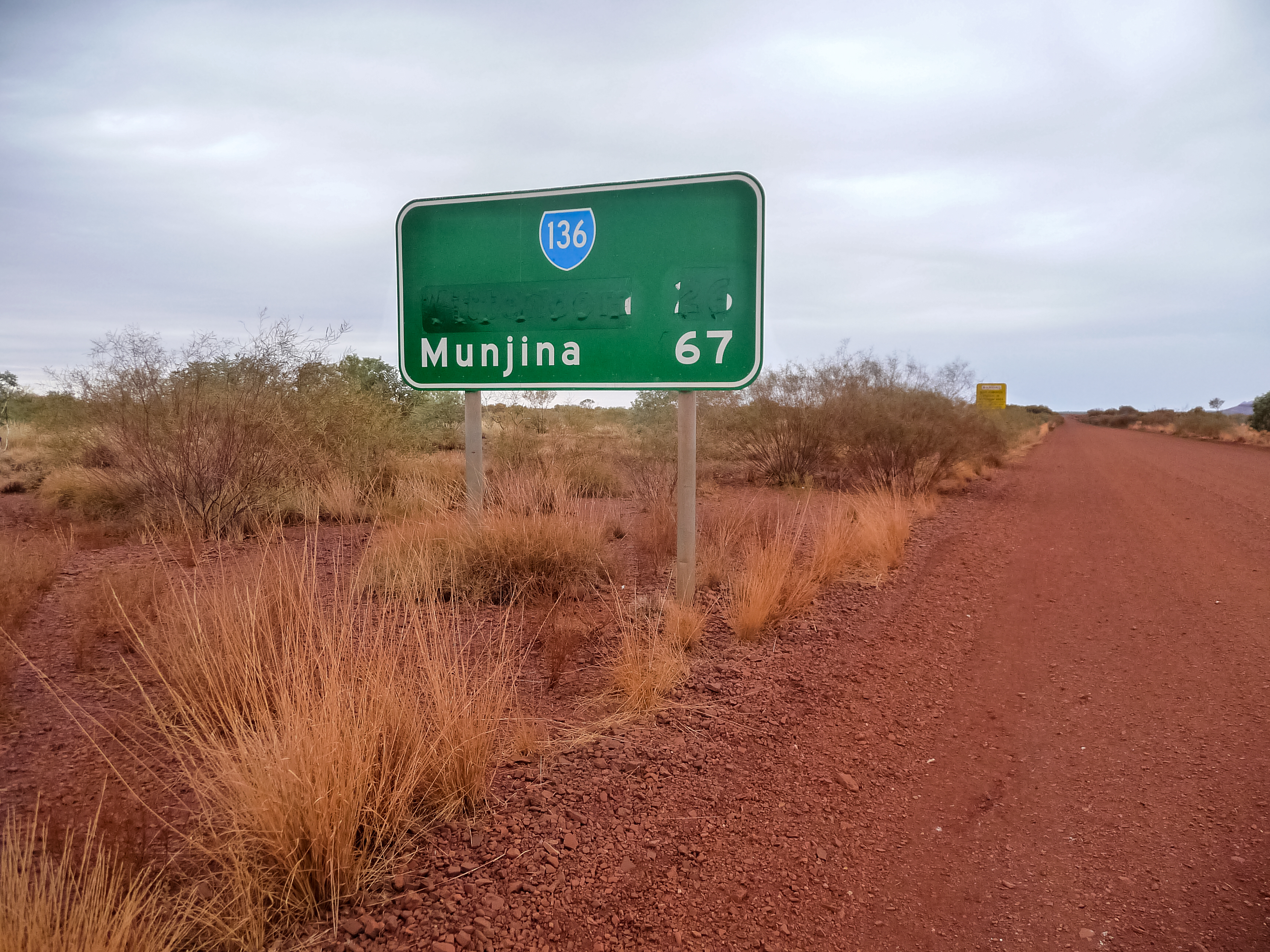
Road sign with the town's name patched over

In November 2006, a report by consultants GHD Group and Parsons Brinckerhoff evaluated the continuing risks associated with asbestos contamination in the town and surrounding areas, classing the danger to visitors as medium and to residents as extreme. In December 2006, Minister for the Pilbara and Regional Development, Jon Ford, said that Wittenoom's status as a town would be removed and, in June 2007, he announced that the townsite status had been officially removed.

Both the Department of Health and an accredited contaminated sites auditor reviewed the report, with the latter finding that the detected presence of free asbestos fibres in surface soils from sampled locations presented an unacceptable public health risk. The auditor recommended that the former townsite and other impacted areas defined in the report be classified as "Contaminated - Remediation Required". On 28 January 2008, the Department of Environment & Conservation classified Wittenoom as a contaminated site under the Contaminated Sites Act 2003.

However, opinion is not unanimous on the danger posed. Mark Nevill, a geologist and former Labor MLC for the Mining and Pastoral Region, said in an interview in 2004 that the asbestos levels in the town were below the detection level of most equipment, and the real danger was located in the gorge itself which contains the mine tailings. Residents once operated a camping ground, guest house and gem shop for passing tourists. The roof of the gem shop is now caved in and the wood of the guest house is rotten, while the camping ground is nowhere to be found.

The Wittenoom steering committee met in April 2013 to finalise closure of the town, limit access to the area, and raise awareness of the risks. Details of how that would be achieved were to be determined but it would probably necessitate removing the town's remaining residents, converting freehold land to crown land, demolishing houses, and closing or rerouting roads. By 2015, six residents remained. In 2017, the number had dropped to four, to three in 2018, and to two in 2021. As of September 2022, Wittenoom had no remaining residents, and demolition of remaining structures by the Western Australian Government began in May 2023.

As of 2016, Wittenoom had only three permanent residents, who defied the Government of Western Australia's announced intention to remove services, disconnect electric power, compulsorily acquire the remaining privately owned properties and demolish the town. There were still three residents in late 2018 and in September 2022, the last resident was evicted.

It was reported in 2018 that thousands of travellers still visited the ghost town every year, as a form of extreme tourism. The Wittenoom Closure Bill was reintroduced to the Western Australian Parliament in August 2021, and was passed on 24 March 2022. The bill enabled the compulsory acquisition and demolition of the 14 remaining privately owned properties in the former townsite.

The Wittenoom Closure Bill was passed by the Western Australian Parliament in March 2022, allowing the government to permanently close Wittenoom by compulsorily acquiring the remaining private properties and remove all infrastructure from the town. As of June 2022, the last two residents were still living in the town, a week after the deadline to vacate. In September 2022, the last resident was evicted. As of September 2022, the town had no remaining residents, was classified as deserted, and closed to the public. A bushfire hit the area around 26 December 2022, causing damage to remaining buildings and disrupting plans to demolish the site during the 2023 dry season. In May 2023 the West Australian government began demolishing the surviving buildings and burying debris on site, but did not commit to cleaning up the remaining piles of asbestos tailings left near the former mine.

=== Remediation claim ===
The traditional owners of country where Wittenoom is situated, the Panyjima people ("Banjima"), have petitioned the Western Australian Parliament to not only remove all of Wittenoom's remaining buildings, but to remediate the land so that it is no longer contaminated. In February 2026, the Banjima Native Title Aboriginal Corporation (BNTAC) formally launched a compensation claim in the Federal Court in Melbourne. BNTAC is pushing for court orders to seal three mines, remove tailings dumps, and demolish asbestos structures in Wittenoom, whilst also demanding clean-up of polluted waterways on Banjima country; in total estimated to cost over A$1.5 billion. The case will be split; first addressing remediation, then seeking damages for asbestos harm and alleged government involvement in the Banjima people’s dispossession.

== Legacy ==
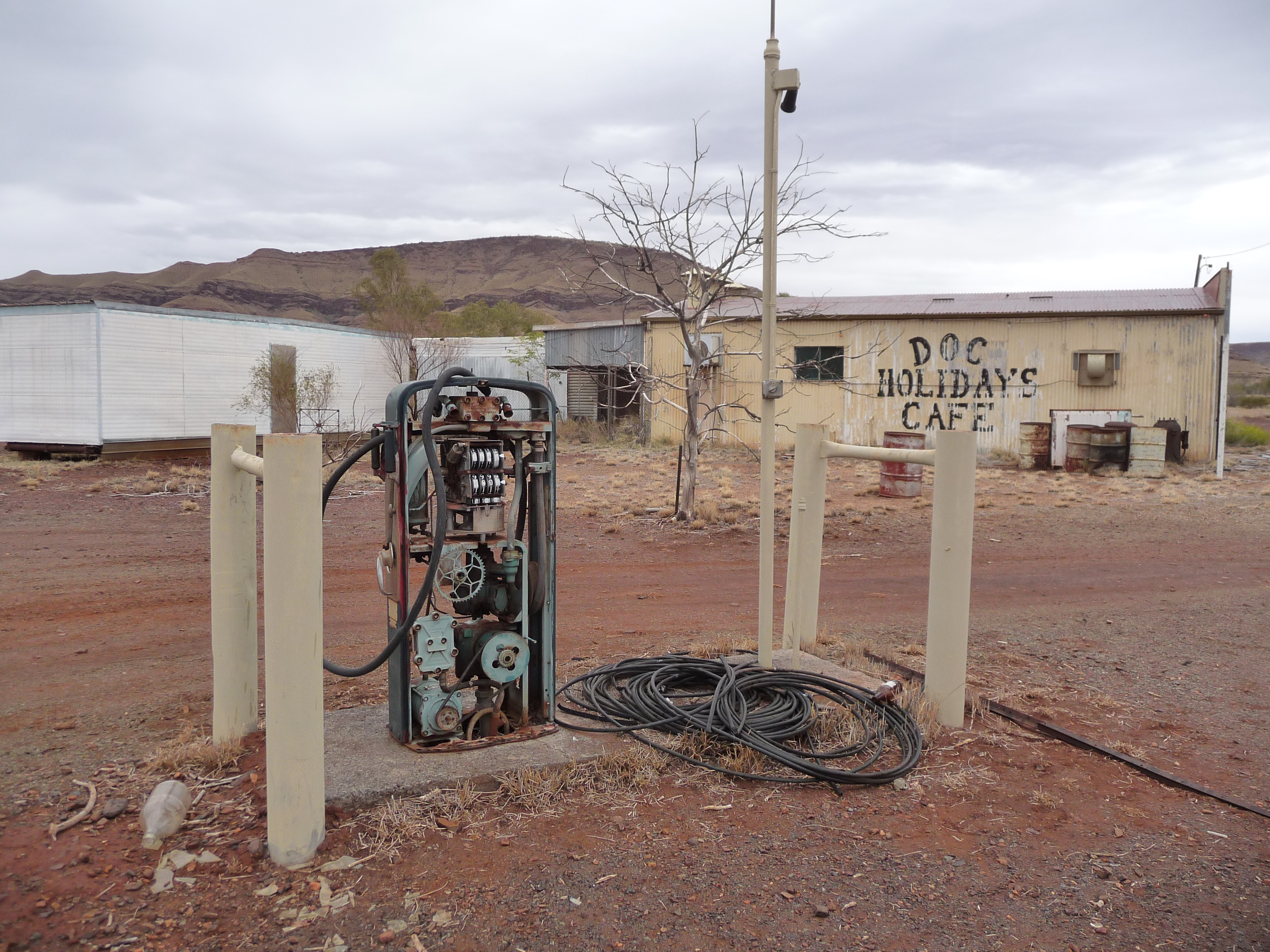
Doc Holidays cafe (abandoned) at the entrance to the town

The 1990 Midnight Oil song, "Blue Sky Mine" and the group's album, Blue Sky Mining, was inspired by the experiences of workers at the Wittenoom asbestos mines who contracted various asbestos-related diseases, as were He Fades Away and Blue Murder by Alistair Hulett. The town and its history are also featured in the novel Dirt Music by Tim Winton.

Digital poet Jason Nelson created the work Wittenoom: speculative shell and the cancerous breeze, an interactive exploration of the town's death. It won the Newcastle Poetry Prize in 2009.

In the thriller novel The Dead Heart, by Douglas Kennedy, the plot involves an imaginary location called Wollanup, which corresponds to Wittenoom. The Dead Heart was adapted as a comic by Kennedy and the illustrator Christian de Metter, under the title Dead Heart.

== Religion ==
In 1968, Wittenoom was one of only two Catholic parishes in the Pilbara.

== Geography ==
=== Climate ===
Wittenoom experiences a hot semi-arid climate (Köppen: BSh) with very hot, wetter summers and cooler, very dry winters. The wettest recorded day was 9 December 1975 with 313.2 mm (12.33 in) of rainfall. The former settlement is very sunny, with 179.1 clear days and 63.0 cloudy per annum. Extreme temperatures ranged from 47.8 °C (118.0 °F) on 27 December 2018 to 1.6 °C (34.9 °F) on 12 July 1968.

Climate data for Wittenoom (22.24°S 118.34°E) (463 m (1,519 ft) AMSL) (1949-2019)
Month	Jan	Feb	Mar	Apr	May	Jun	Jul	Aug	Sep	Oct	Nov	Dec	Year
Record high °C (°F)	47.6 (117.7)	47.5 (117.5)	45.7 (114.3)	42.0 (107.6)	37.4 (99.3)	33.0 (91.4)	32.6 (90.7)	35.3 (95.5)	39.5 (103.1)	44.0 (111.2)	44.7 (112.5)	47.8 (118.0)	47.8 (118.0)
Mean daily maximum °C (°F)	39.5 (103.1)	37.9 (100.2)	36.7 (98.1)	33.3 (91.9)	27.9 (82.2)	24.5 (76.1)	24.4 (75.9)	26.9 (80.4)	31.3 (88.3)	35.5 (95.9)	38.1 (100.6)	39.8 (103.6)	33.0 (91.4)
Mean daily minimum °C (°F)	26.0 (78.8)	25.4 (77.7)	24.4 (75.9)	21.2 (70.2)	16.2 (61.2)	12.8 (55.0)	11.6 (52.9)	13.2 (55.8)	16.9 (62.4)	20.9 (69.6)	23.6 (74.5)	25.5 (77.9)	19.8 (67.7)
Record low °C (°F)	17.2 (63.0)	15.5 (59.9)	12.8 (55.0)	10.2 (50.4)	5.6 (42.1)	4.0 (39.2)	1.6 (34.9)	3.4 (38.1)	6.7 (44.1)	6.7 (44.1)	12.2 (54.0)	16.8 (62.2)	1.6 (34.9)
Average precipitation mm (inches)	115.9 (4.56)	103.1 (4.06)	68.9 (2.71)	27.3 (1.07)	26.7 (1.05)	29.3 (1.15)	13.7 (0.54)	7.7 (0.30)	2.9 (0.11)	3.9 (0.15)	9.5 (0.37)	48.4 (1.91)	457.0 (17.99)
Average precipitation days (≥ 0.2 mm)	9.1	8.9	5.9	3.4	3.4	3.0	2.0	1.3	0.7	1.0	2.0	4.8	45.5
Average afternoon relative humidity (%)	26	31	27	27	30	33	29	24	18	16	16	20	25
Average dew point °C (°F)	12.2 (54.0)	14.0 (57.2)	11.0 (51.8)	9.0 (48.2)	6.1 (43.0)	4.9 (40.8)	2.9 (37.2)	2.3 (36.1)	1.6 (34.9)	2.8 (37.0)	4.3 (39.7)	8.7 (47.7)	6.7 (44.0)
Source: Bureau of Meteorology (1949-2019)

== Sources ==
- Ryan, Micheal (6 December 1966). "Death of a town". The Age.

== General references ==
- Glossop, Laurie (11–13 November 2019). Wittenoom Geology and History (PDF). Asbestos Safety 2019 Conference. Perth. pp. 19–39.
