= Ophthalmia Range =

Mountain range in Western Australia

Coordinates: 23°16′29″S 119°33′27″E

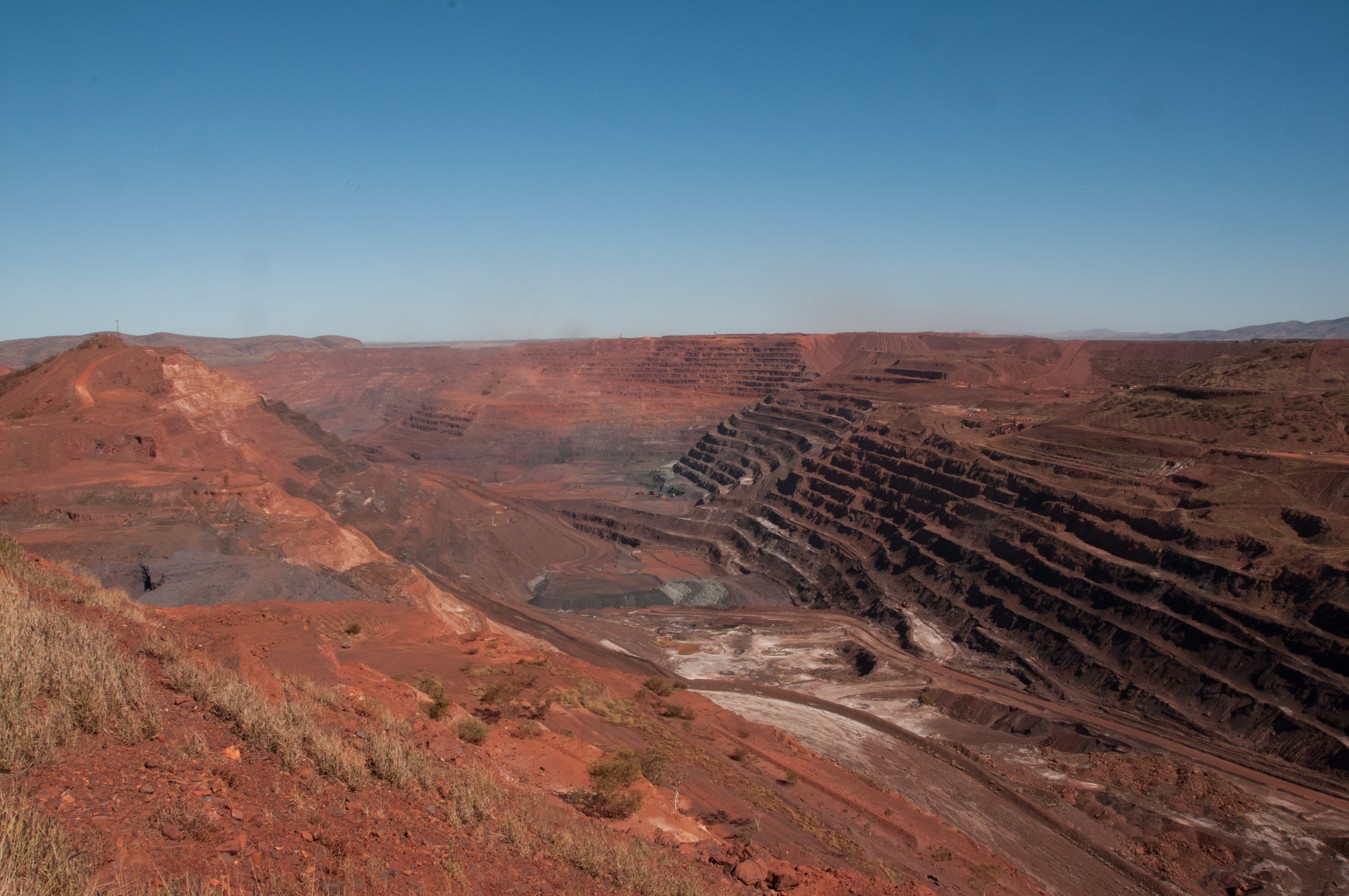
Mount Whaleback iron ore mine, at the eastern end of the range

The Ophthalmia Range is a mountain range in the Pilbara region of Western Australia, approximately 1,190 kilometres (739 mi) north of Perth. There are some variations of the spelling of Ophthalmia. The eastern end of the range is connected to the Hamersley Range. The nearest town is Newman, approximately 20 kilometres (12 mi) to the south, in the Hamersley Range.

== History ==
The area is part of the traditional lands of the Panyjima people, who had apparently displaced the Mandara as a result of the pressure on the local indigenous inhabitants resulting from the impact of the occupation of the country by Europeans.

The first recorded European sighting of the range was in 1861, by the explorer Francis Thomas Gregory, who noted the obvious iron ore deposits that give the range its colour. The range was named in 1876 by Ernest Giles, who was temporarily blind when he reached the area, having travelled east from the headwaters of the Ashburton River, and had to be led by his second in charge Alec Ross. Giles named the range after his condition. His vision later recovered and he was unimpressed with the land.

The next expedition to the area was conducted in 1896, when Aubrey Woodward Newman attempted to lead a party overland from Cue to Roebourne. Newman succumbed to typhoid before the expedition began and William Rudell took command. He later named Mount Newman (1,053 metres; 3,455 ft) after his deceased leader.

Daisy Bates and her husband Jack had a pastoral lease in the Ophthalmia Range, which they relinquished in 1914. The lease was taken over in the same year by William Albert Snell (1872–1942), a Western Australian Outback identity.

The area was surveyed by geologist H. Talbot in 1913. He travelled through the area north of Peak Hill as part of a larger survey that commenced in 1910. The survey was mostly interested in gold and copper, and made no mention of the iron ore deposits.

Mount Whaleback, which has been mined for iron ore for over 20 years, is a part of the Ophthalmia Range. The eastern end of the range is connected to the Hamersley Range.
