= Panyjima people =

Aboriginal Australian people

The Panyjima, also known as the Pandjima/Banjima, are an Aboriginal Australian people of the Pilbara region of Western Australia.

== Language ==
The Panyjima speak the language also known as Panyjima, one of the Ngayarda sub-group of the Pama-Nyungan languages. The number of speakers was estimated in 2002 to be around fifty.

== Country ==
According to Norman Tindale, the Panyjima held sway over 17,000 square kilometres (6,600 mi^{2}) of tribal territory. They dwelt on the upper plateau of the Hamersley Range and as far south as the Fortescue River. Their eastern frontier lay at Weeli Wolli Creek, near Marillana. Their southern limits lay around Rocklea and on the upper branches of Turee Creek, as ran east as far as the Kunderong Range.

== History of contact ==
Pre-European contact, the highland Kurrama peoples pressured them out to shift east as far as Yandicoogina and the Ophthalmia Range, a movement which in turn drove the Mandara and Niabali eastwards.

== Native title ==
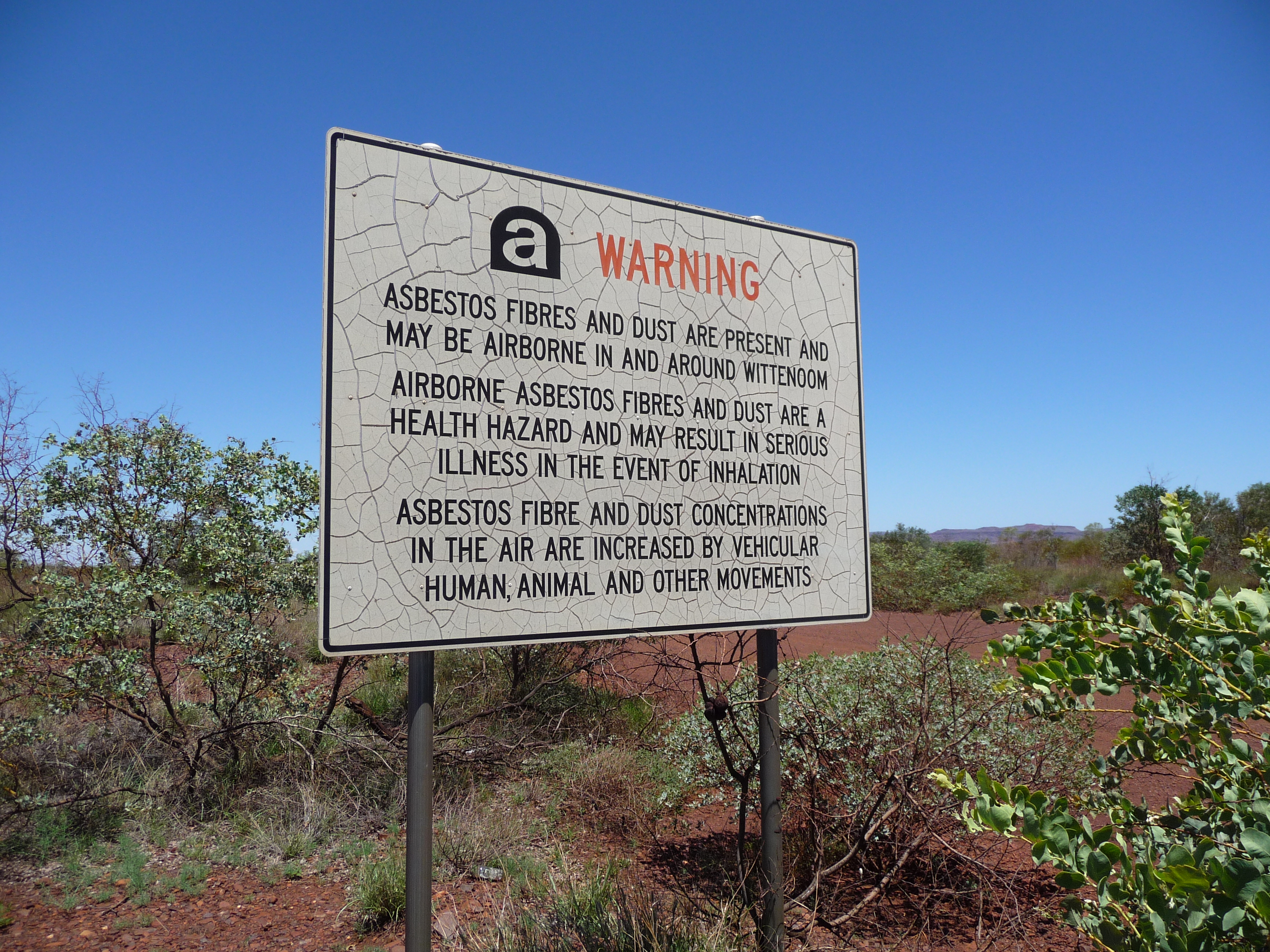
State government warning sign near the entrance to Wittenoom township in Western Australia

The Panyjima people hold native title since 2014 over the asbestos-contaminated Wittenoom area, known as Ngambigunha by its people, and campaign for the area's clean-up by the Western Australian Government.

== Alternative names ==
- Bandjima (western tribal pronunciation)
- Mandanjongo ("top people", Nyamal exonym for plateau people such as the Panyjima and the Yindjibarndi)
- Panjima, Pand'ima

== Sources ==
- "AIATSIS map of Indigenous Australia". AIATSIS. 14 May 2024.
- Allam, Lorena; Wahlquist, Calla (10 June 2020). "BHP to destroy at least 40 Aboriginal sites, up to 15,000 years old, to expand Pilbara mine". The Guardian.
- McGregor, William (2002). Verb Classification in Australian Languages. Walter de Gruyter. ISBN 978-3-110-17141-9.
- "Tindale Tribal Boundaries" (PDF). Department of Aboriginal Affairs, Western Australia. September 2016. Archived from the original (PDF) on 8 March 2016.
- Tindale, Norman Barnett (1974). "Pandjima". Aboriginal Tribes of Australia: Their Terrain, Environmental Controls, Distribution, Limits, and Proper Names. Australian National University. ISBN 978-0-708-10741-6. Archived from the original on 20 March 2020.
