= Panyjima language =

Australian Aboriginal language

Banyjima
- Native to: Australia
- Region: Pilbara region of Western Australia
- Ethnicity: Panyjima people
- Native speakers: 140 (2021 census)
- Language family: Pama–Nyungan: Ngayarda; Banyjima
- Dialects: Pantikura; Mitjaranjpa

Language codes
- ISO 639-3: pnw
- Glottolog: pany1241
- AIATSIS: A53 Banyjima (cover term)
- ELP: Panyjima
- Banjima is classified as Severely Endangered by the UNESCO Atlas of the World's Languages in Danger.

Panyjima is an Australian Aboriginal language spoken in the Hamersley Range, in the Pilbara region of Western Australia. It is the traditional language of the Panyjima people. The name has also been spelled Bandjima, Banjima, Banyjima, Paanjima, Pandjima, Panjima, Panjtjima, and Panytyima.

Like most indigenous Australian languages, Panyjima is endangered. Younger generations have English as a first language and make little distinction between Panyjima and its closely related neighbouring languages. There is a formal language register known as padupadu.

== Classification ==
Panyjima is classified as a member of the Ngayarta branch of the Pama–Nyungan languages. Under Carl Georg von Brandenstein's 1967 classification, Martuthunira was classed as an Inland Ngayarda language, but the separation of the Ngayarda languages into Coastal and Inland groups is no longer considered valid.

== Phonology ==
Orthography in brackets when it differs from IPA.

=== Consonants ===
	Peripheral		Laminal		Apical	
	Bilabial	Velar	Palatal	Dental	Alveolar	Retroflex
Stop	p	k	c ⟨ť⟩	t̪ ⟨th⟩	t	ʈ ⟨rt⟩
Nasal	m	ŋ ⟨g⟩	ɲ ⟨ň⟩	n̪ ⟨nh⟩	n	ɳ ⟨rn⟩
Lateral			ʎ ⟨ľ⟩	l̪ ⟨lh⟩	l	ɭ ⟨rl⟩
Rhotic					r ⟨ŕ⟩	ɻ ⟨r⟩
Semivowel	w		j			

=== Vowels ===
	Front	Back
High	i iː	u uː
Low	a aː	

The long vowels are rare.

== Grammar ==
=== Accusative alignment ===
Accusative alignment. A = subject of a transitive verb; S = subject of an intransitive verb; O = object of a transitive verb.

Unlike most Australian languages, which exhibit ergativity, Panyjima and the other Ngayarta languages have an accusative alignment. That is, the subjects of transitive verbs are treated the same as the subjects of intransitive verbs, while the objects are treated differently.
