= Newman, Western Australia =

Newman
- Town
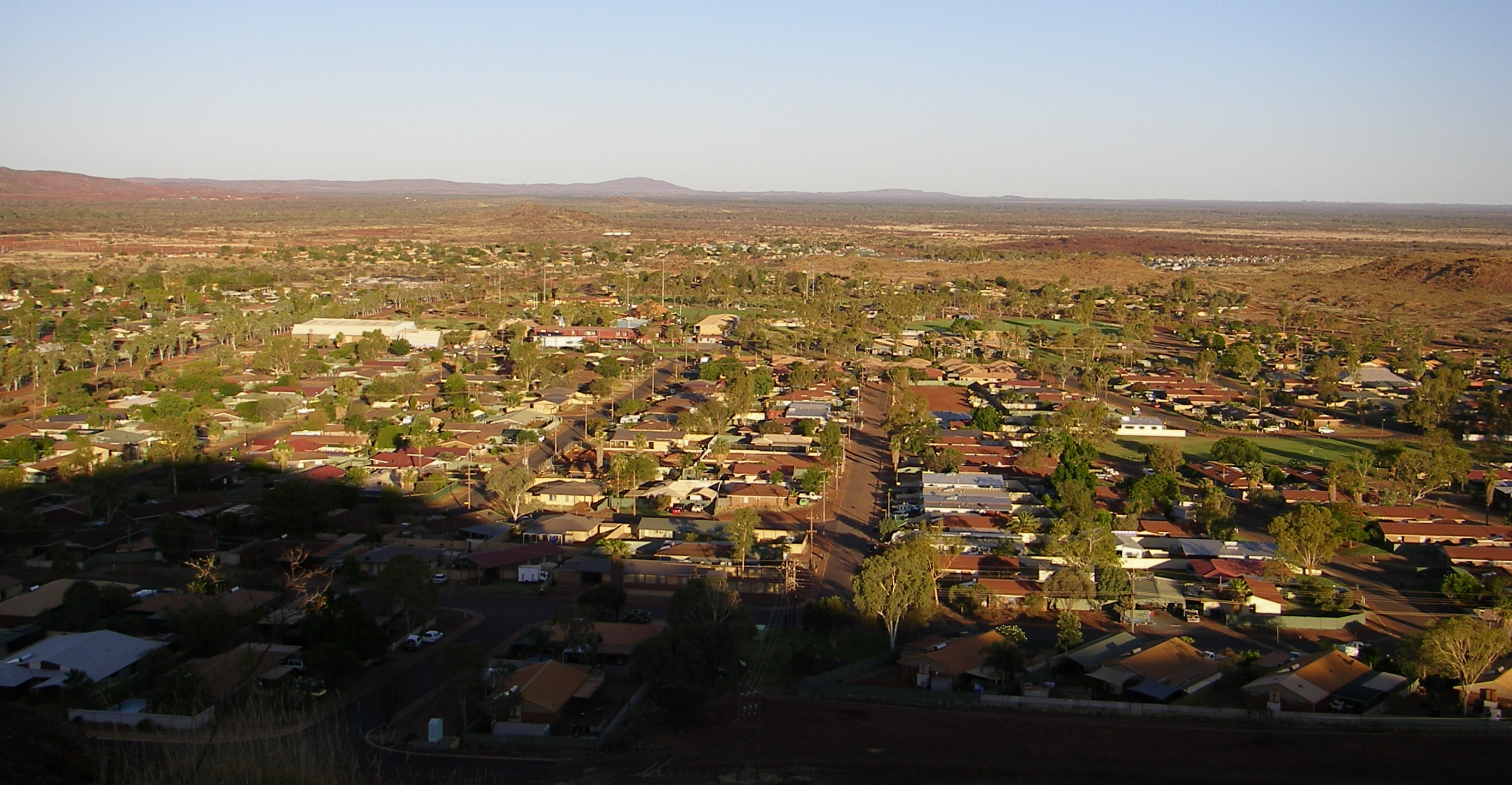
- Newman residential area

- Interactive map of Newman
- Coordinates: 23°21′14″S 119°43′55″E
- Country: Australia
- State: Western Australia
- LGA: Shire of East Pilbara
- Location: 1,189 km (739 mi) N of Perth; 452 km (281 mi) S of Port Hedland; 404 km (251 mi) N of Meekatharra; 277 km (172 mi) SE of Tom Price
- Established: 1966

Government
  - State electorate: Pilbara
  - Federal division: Durack

Area
  - Total: 28,031.2 km^{2} (10,822.9 sq mi)
- Elevation: 544 m (1,785 ft)

Population
  - Total: 6,456 (SAL 2021)
- Postcode: 6753
- Mean max temp: 38.2 °C (100.8 °F)
- Mean min temp: 17.3 °C (63.1 °F)
- Annual rainfall: 312.0 mm (12.28 in)

Newman, originally named Mount Newman until 1981, is a town in the Pilbara region of Western Australia. It is located about 1,186 kilometres (737 mi) north of Perth, and 9 kilometres (5.6 mi) north of the Tropic of Capricorn. It can be reached by the Great Northern Highway. Newman is a modern mining town, with homes contrasting with the surrounding reddish desert. As of the 2021 census, Newman had a population of 6,456. The Hickman Crater, a meteorite impact crater discovered in 2007, is 35 kilometres (22 mi) north of Newman.

== History ==
Mount Newman

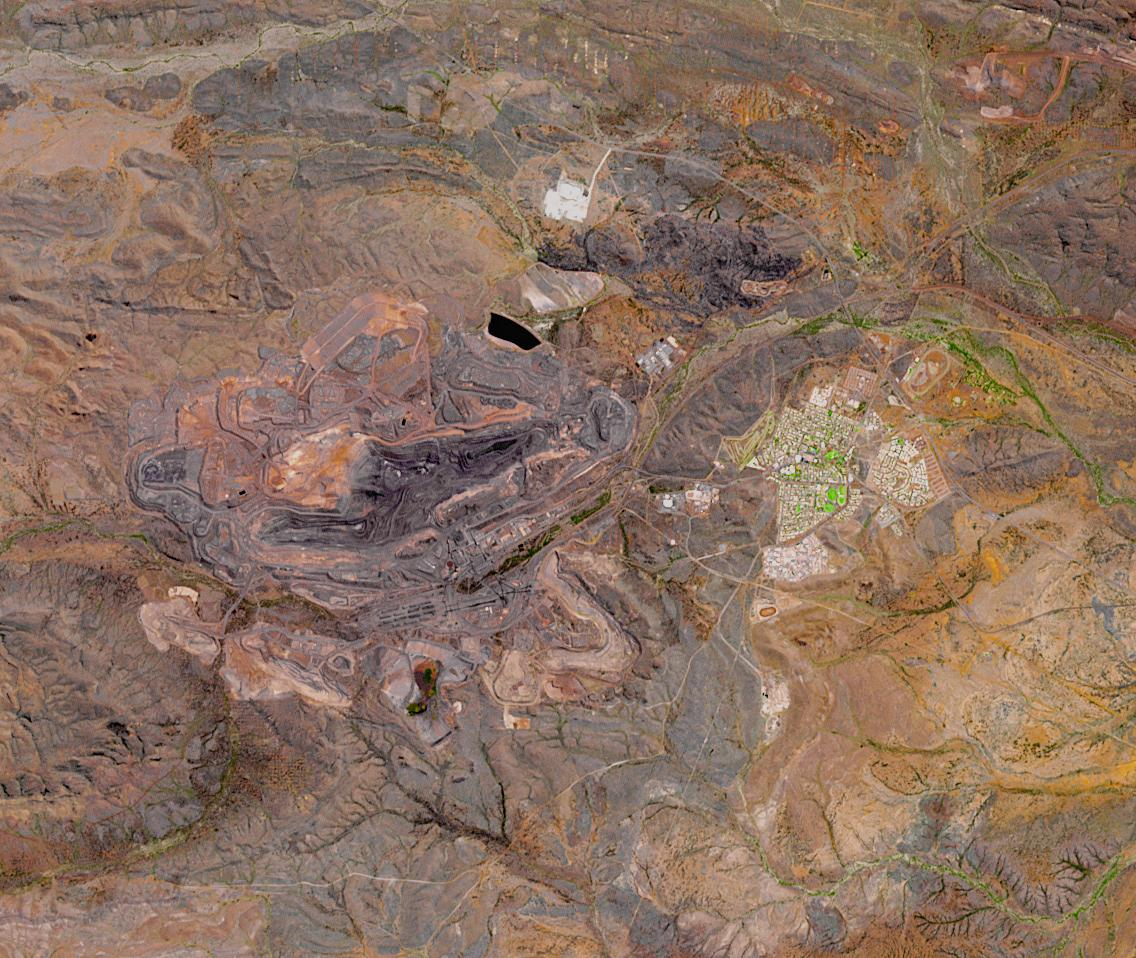
Satellite image of Newman, to the East of Mount Whaleback mine, on 2 October 2017.

Newman was established as Mount Newman by Mt. Newman Mining Co. Pty Ltd (a subsidiary of BHP) in 1966 as a company town to support the development of iron ore deposits at nearby Mount Whaleback. The town takes its name from nearby Mount Newman, named in honour of government surveyor Aubrey Woodward Newman (son of Edward Newman who also died young) who died of typhoid aged 28 at Cue on 24 May 1896, while on an expedition from Nannine to the Ophthalmia Range. William Frederick Rudall then took charge of the expedition and named Mount Newman to honour his deceased leader.

Aboriginal occupation of the area goes back around 45,000 years. The Martu people comprise about a dozen language groups that extend across the Gibson and Great Sandy Deserts. The Martu progressively lost their land and nomadic lifestyle as European expansion crept inland from the late 19th century. Western exploration, the establishment of Christian missions, and gold discoveries at Marble Bar and Wiluna led to Indigenous people being forced from their ancestral lands.

In a 2002 memoir, British businessman Alistair McAlpine (1942–2014) described passing through the town on his way to view wildflowers at Collier Range National Park: "On to Newman, a most unlikely town. Just as King's Park is a chunk of wilderness in the city, so Newman is a chunk of suburbia in the wilderness, almost the same size. They could be exchanged and nobody would suspect a thing."

== Commercial area and amenities ==
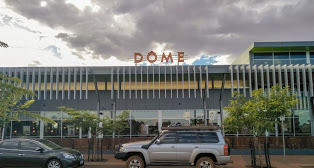
The Dome Cafe seen at the front of Parnawarri

Typical of company towns, Newman is laid out with a core, where shopping and hotels are located, surrounded by residential areas, with more industrial activities on the outskirts. There are two supermarkets in town (one Woolworths and an IGA), two shopping plazas, three hotels, and three bars/restaurants outside of those contained in the hotels. One public outdoor pool serves the town's population.

In late 2017, Parnawarri Retail centre (Parnawarri meaning "united" or "all together" in Nyiyaparli) was opened and houses the town's second supermarket (IGA) as well as a Dome coffeehouse, SportsPower and a Chicken Treat. BHP invested $30 million to build the retail centre.

The town contains Newman Primary School, South Newman Primary School, Newman Senior High School, and Rawa Community School.

== Transport and infrastructure ==
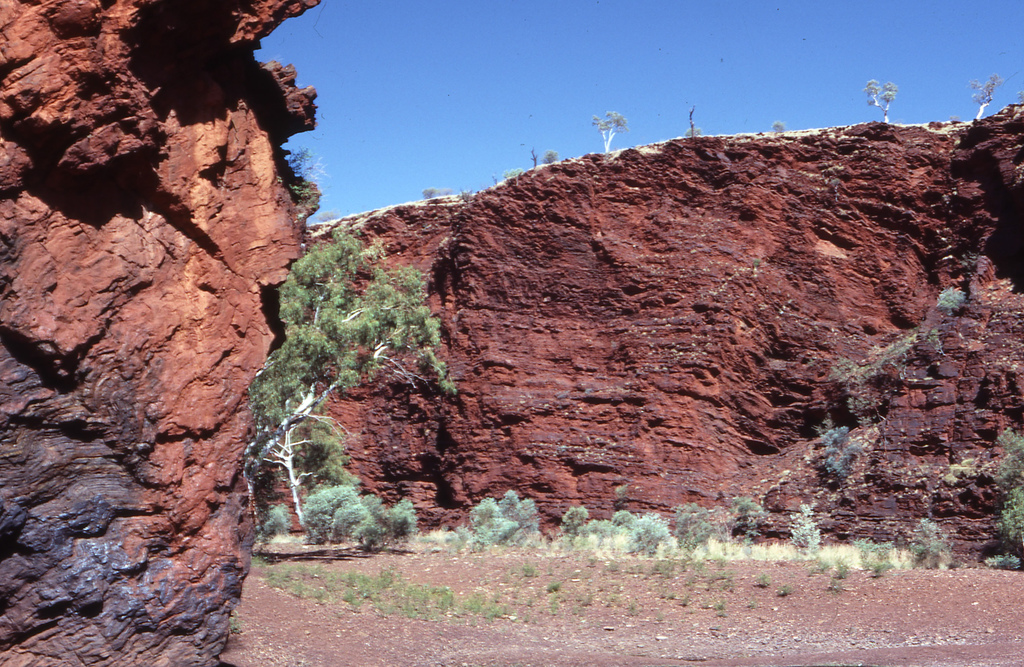
Iron deposits

Newman is located at the end of route 138 meeting the Great Northern Highway.

The town is served by Newman Airport.

A privately owned railway, the Mount Newman railway, was constructed linking it to Port Hedland, which itself was upgraded to handle shipment of the ore to the world market. On 21 June 2001 a train 7.35 km (4.57 mi) long, comprising 682 ore cars and eight locomotives made the Newman—Port Hedland trip and is listed as the world's longest-ever train. The ore trains are typically over 2 km long. Newman is also a service town to nearby mining settlements including Tom Price and Paraburdoo.

Electricity is supplied by Alinta from its 180 MW gas-fired power station with a 30MW/11MWh Kokam battery at Newman. The station also supplies the Roy Hill mine, with grid construction reaching the Cloudbreak and Christmas Creek mines.

== Architecture ==
Being founded in the 1960s, Newman's architecture reflects the modernist styles of that decade and the next, being predominantly functional and devoid of detail or embellishment. As the town was founded and built by a steel company, the majority of buildings use steel frame construction. This applies to the homes themselves, most of them being two prefabricated halves inserted together into a steel I-section frame, the columns of which are left exposed on the exterior of the home. This construction method serves not only to showcase the company's product, but also gives strong resistance to cyclone winds which can affect the region from time to time. For this same reason most houses are elevated from the ground by a few steps. Many houses also have large air-conditioning units situated next to them to provide adequate cooling against the hot summer temperatures.

== Climate ==
Newman has a hot desert climate (Köppen climate classification BWh), with very hot summers and mild winters. The temperature reaches or exceeds 38 °C (100 °F) for many days in the summer. On 15 January 1998, the temperature reached an all-time recorded high of 47 °C (117 °F). The annual average rainfall is 329.5 millimetres (13.0 in) which would make it a semi-arid climate except that its high evapotranspiration, or its barrenness, makes it a desert climate.

Precipitation is sparse, but the influx of monsoonal moisture in the summer, which generally begins in December and lasts until April, raises humidity levels and can cause occasional heavy storms. Winter months are mild to warm, with daily high temperatures ranging from the 20 °C (68 °F) to 26 °C (79 °F), and low (nighttime) temperatures rarely dipping below 6 °C (43 °F).

Climate data for Newman (Newman Aero)
Month	Jan	Feb	Mar	Apr	May	Jun	Jul	Aug	Sep	Oct	Nov	Dec	Year
Record high °C (°F)	47.0 (116.6)	46.1 (115.0)	45.2 (113.4)	40.9 (105.6)	35.5 (95.9)	33.0 (91.4)	31.4 (88.5)	35.6 (96.1)	38.1 (100.6)	42.9 (109.2)	43.9 (111.0)	46.7 (116.1)	47.0 (116.6)
Mean daily maximum °C (°F)	39.1 (102.4)	37.5 (99.5)	35.8 (96.4)	32.1 (89.8)	27.1 (80.8)	23.1 (73.6)	23.2 (73.8)	26.3 (79.3)	30.6 (87.1)	35.2 (95.4)	37.5 (99.5)	39.4 (102.9)	32.2 (90.0)
Mean daily minimum °C (°F)	25.2 (77.4)	24.1 (75.4)	22.3 (72.1)	17.7 (63.9)	11.9 (53.4)	7.6 (45.7)	6.5 (43.7)	8.3 (46.9)	12.6 (54.7)	17.8 (64.0)	21.1 (70.0)	24.3 (75.7)	16.6 (61.9)
Record low °C (°F)	15.8 (60.4)	14.9 (58.8)	9.0 (48.2)	6.0 (42.8)	1.0 (33.8)	−1.1 (30.0)	−2.0 (28.4)	−2.0 (28.4)	1.0 (33.8)	6.0 (42.8)	8.9 (48.0)	13.0 (55.4)	−2.0 (28.4)
Average precipitation mm (inches)	69.0 (2.72)	70.2 (2.76)	43.5 (1.71)	21.2 (0.83)	18.2 (0.72)	16.2 (0.64)	13.2 (0.52)	6.1 (0.24)	5.5 (0.22)	5.7 (0.22)	13.0 (0.51)	35.4 (1.39)	320.7 (12.63)
Average precipitation days	6.9	6.7	4.7	3.4	2.9	3.1	2.3	1.3	0.9	1.6	2.9	4.9	41.6
Average afternoon relative humidity (%)	25	34	28	29	27	32	29	22	17	14	15	20	24

== See also ==
- Pilbara historical timeline
- Pilbara newspapers
- Red Dog (Pilbara)
