= Pilbara Iron =

Mining company

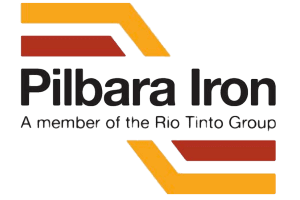
- Type: Subsidiary
- Industry: Mining
- Founded: 2004
- Founder: Rio Tinto; Robe River Iron Associates
- Headquarters: Perth, Western Australia
- Products: Iron Ore
- Parent: Rio Tinto
- Subsidiaries: See below
- Website: www.pilbarairon.com

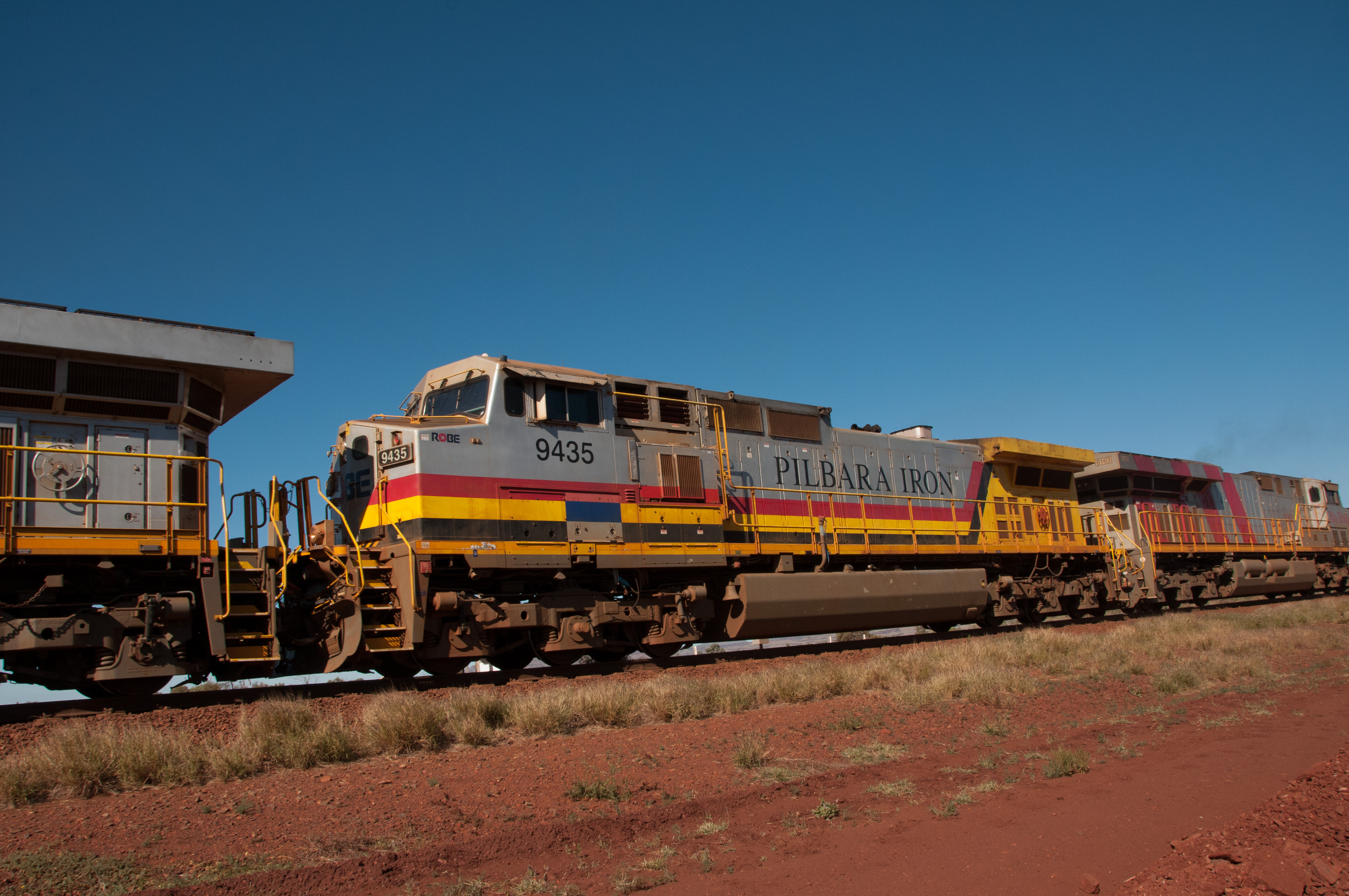
Pilbara Iron train, Tom Price to Dampier Railway

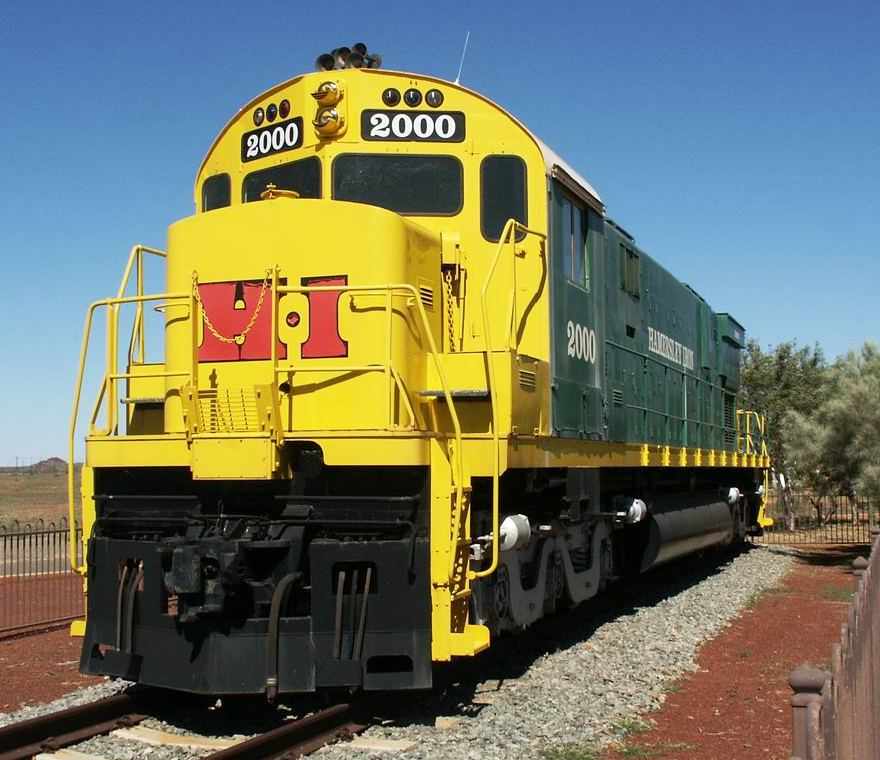
Hamersley Iron Alco C628 locomotive at 7 Mile Yard, Dampier, Western Australia.

Pilbara Iron manages assets for Hamersley Iron Pty Ltd, a subsidiary of Rio Tinto, and Robe River Iron Associates, an unincorporated joint venture between Rio Tinto (53%) and Japanese steel companies Mitsui Iron Ore Development (33%) and Nippon Steel (14%).

All of these companies are involved in the mining of iron ore, predominantly from the Pilbara region of Western Australia.

In 2004, it was announced that Hamersley and Robe River would merge their operations as Pilbara Iron. The concept had been tested by the formation of Pilbara Rail in 2001, which generated more than $16 million in savings. Pilbara Rail was folded into Pilbara Iron in 2005. Each company continues to market products separately and retains ownership and profits from the underlying mines, as well as strategic development of their own mineral resources.

== Current mine sites ==
Mine sites currently operating:

- Brockman mine (1992)
- Brockman 4 mine (2010)
- Channar mine (1990)
- Eastern Range mine (2004)
- Hope Downs mine (2007)
- Hope Downs 4 mine (2014)
- Marandoo mine (1994)
- Mesa A mine (2010)
- Mesa J mine (1994)
- Mount Tom Price mine (1966)
- Nammuldi mine (2003)
- Paraburdoo mine (1972)
- West Angelas mine (2002)
- Western Range mine (2025)
- Yandicoogina mine (1998)

All iron ore mined at the sites is transported on the Hamersley & Robe River railway, one of the world's largest privately owned railways to Dampier and Cape Lambert. From there the ore is shipped across the world, with China and Japan the largest markets as of 2007.

== Historical events ==
July 1962: Hamersley Holdings Pty Ltd is formed to develop deposits in the Hamersley Range.

September 1962: Thomas Moore Price dies shortly after receiving news of the discovery of promising deposits at what would later be called Mount Tom Price.

August 1963, Hamersley Holdings Pty Ltd, a subsidiary owned by Conzinc-Riotinto of Australia (60%) and Kaiser Steel (40%), signed a 30-year agreement with the Government of Western Australia for the development of iron ore leases held by the company and for the eventual establishment of an integrated iron and steel industry. The $175 million over 30 years program was established in anticipation of supplying iron ore to the Japanese steel industry.

February 1964: a proposal is announced for Hamersley Iron to export 65 million tons over 15 years starting in 1967 to the Japanese steel industry. Reserves estimated at five billion tons of 50% to 66% by Kaiser Steel. Ten involved Japanese steel works cited in the Iron Age article.

1964: Japanese firms sign contract to buy five million tons from the Western Mining Corporation for $69 million with deliveries to start in 1966.

January 1965: Hamersley Iron signed a contract to sell over a 15-year period starting in 1966 65.5 million tons at a price of $600 million. A 176-mile railway line and a port at King Bay for ore carriers up to 100,000 tons was to be constructed. Mount Goldsworthy Mining Associated, a joint venture of Cyprus Mines Corporation of Los Angeles, Utah Construction Company of San Francisco, Consolidated Gold Fields of London, signed a $164 million contract for 16.5 million tons of Western Australia ore with Japanese buyers. Also a $60 million contract for pellets from Tasmania to Japan was signed at the time. Reported as an 82 million tons, $757 million over 17-year contract by International Commerce.

June 1965: Hamersley Iron agreed to sell 16 million tons of iron ore pellets to Japan at one million tons per year and planned to build a pelletizing plant at King Bay.

August 1965: Hamersley agreed to sell to Kobe Steel $16 million worth of low grade iron ore from Mount Tom Price bringing the total in sales contracts to $825 million.

- May 1967 – Hamersley Holdings shares list on the Australian Securities Exchange in the largest initial public offering in Australian history
- May 1974 – Hamersley Europe Pty. Limited incorporated

In June 1979, Kaiser Steel sold its 28% shareholding in Hamersley Holdings to Conzinc Riotinto for $207.5 million, bringing the Rio Tinto share of the company to 82%.

== Film Red Dog ==
The film Red Dog, based on stories about an actual wandering dog of the Pilbara region, was made at Hamersley Iron locations.

== See also ==
- Pilbara historical timeline
- Pilbara newspapers
