= Acacia daweana =

Suzanne's golden-pod wattle

Conservation status
- Priority Three — Poorly Known Taxa (DEC)

Scientific classification
- Kingdom: Plantae
- Clade: Tracheophytes
- Clade: Angiosperms
- Clade: Eudicots
- Clade: Rosids
- Order: Fabales
- Family: Fabaceae
- Subfamily: Caesalpinioideae
- Clade: Mimosoid clade
- Genus: Acacia
- Species: A. daweana

Binomial name
- Acacia daweana Maslin
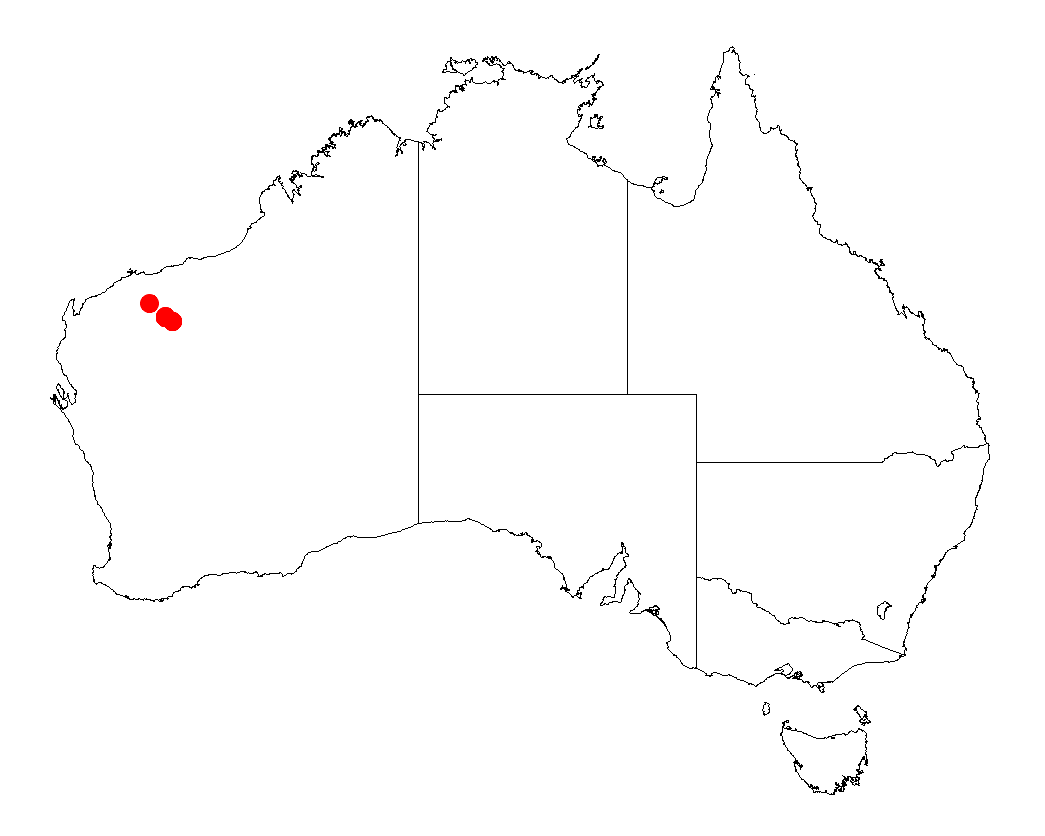
- Occurrence data from AVH

Synonyms
- Racosperma daweanum (Maslin) Pedley

Species of legume

Acacia daweana, commonly known as Dawe's wattle, is a species of flowering plant in the family Fabaceae and is endemic to the north-west of Western Australia. It is a low, spreading shrub with grey bark, narrowly elliptic phyllodes, spikes of light golden yellow flowers and narrowly oblong pods constricted between and raised over the seeds.

== Description ==
Acacia daweana is a low, spreading, often flat-topped shrub that typically grows to a height of up to 1.5 m (4 ft 11 in). Its bark is grey, peeling more or less in minni ritchi fashion at the base of the stems. The phyllodes are narrowly elliptic, straight to slightly curved downwards, 30–70 mm (1.2–2.8 in) long, 6–14 mm (0.24–0.55 in) wide and leathery with many closely parallel veins. There are stipules 1–2 mm (0.039–0.079 in) long and more or less persistent at the base of the phyllodes. The flowers are light golden yellow and borne in a spike 25–40 mm (0.98–1.57 in) long in axils on a peduncle 5–10 mm (0.20–0.39 in) long. Flowering mainly occurs between June and August and the pods are more or less narrowly oblong, up to 40 mm (1.6 in) long and 5–7 mm (0.20–0.28 in) wide, constricted between and raised over the seeds. The seeds are elliptic, about 3 mm (0.12 in) long and dull, light brown with a yellowish aril near the end.

== Taxonomy ==
Acacia daweana was first formally described in 1982 by Bruce Maslin from specimens collected 6 km (3.7 mi) north of Marandoo on the road to Tom Price. The specific epithet (daweana) was 'named for Mr Chris Dawe in appreciation for his assistance in preparing the description of this species".

== Distribution and habitat ==
Dawe's wattle is only known from the Pilbara region of north-western Western Australia, where it grows in rocky rises and along drainage lines among spinifex in the Hamersley Range and in Karijini National Park.

== Conservation status ==
Acacia daweana is listed as "Priority Three" by the Government of Western Australia Department of Biodiversity, Conservation and Attractions, meaning that it is poorly known and known from only a few locations but is not under imminent threat.

== See also ==
- List of Acacia species
