= Cryptandra monticola =

Scientific classification
- Kingdom: Plantae
- Clade: Tracheophytes
- Clade: Angiosperms
- Clade: Eudicots
- Clade: Rosids
- Order: Rosales
- Family: Rhamnaceae
- Genus: Cryptandra
- Species: C. monticola

Binomial name
- Cryptandra monticola Rye & Trudgen

Species of flowering plant

Cryptandra monticola is a flowering plant in the family Rhamnaceae and is endemic to the south-west of Western Australia. It is an erect or spreading shrub with linear or narrowly oblong to elliptic leaves and head-like clusters of white, tube-shaped flowers.

== Description ==
Cryptandra monticola is an erect or spreading shrub that typically grows to a height of 0.5–1.5 m (1 ft 8 in – 4 ft 11 in), its branchlets not spiny, its young stems densely hairy at first. The leaves are linear or narrowly oblong to elliptic, 3–6.5 mm (0.12–0.26 in) long and 1.0–2.5 mm (0.039–0.098 in) wide, on a petiole 0.4–1.3 mm (0.016–0.051 in) long with stipules 1.3–2.5 mm (0.051–0.098 in) long at the base. The edges of the leaves are curved down, the upper surface densely covered with star-shaped hairs, the lower surface partly concealed. The flowers are white with about 6 egg-shaped floral bracts 1.0–3.5 mm (0.039–0.138 in) long at the base. The floral tube is 1.7–2.4 mm (0.067–0.094 in) long, joined at the base for 0.6–1 mm (0.024–0.039 in) and hairy. The sepals are 1.3–1.7 mm (0.051–0.067 in) long and hairy, the petals about 0.7 mm (0.028 in) long, and the style 1.3–1.6 mm (0.051–0.063 in) long. Flowering occurs from April to August, and the fruit is a schizocarp 1.5–3.5 mm (0.059–0.138 in) long and hidden inside the floral tube, now 3.0–3.5 mm (0.12–0.14 in) long.

== Taxonomy and naming ==
Cryptandra monticola was first formally described in 1995 by Barbara Lynette Rye and Malcolm Eric Trudgen in the journal Nuytsia from specimens collected near the headquarters of the Karijini National Park in 1991. The specific epithet (monticola ) means "mountain-inhabitant", referring to its distribution on the two highest mountains in Western Australia.

== Distribution and habitat ==
This cryptandra mostly grows on the south-facing slopes of Mount Shiela and Mount Nameless at altitudes of 800 m (2,600 ft) or more in the Hamersley Range east of Newman in the Pilbara bioregion of northern Western Australia.

== Conservation status ==
Cryptandra monticola is listed as "not threatened" by the Government of Western Australia Department of Biodiversity, Conservation and Attractions.
