= Nammuldi mine =

Iron ore mine in Western Australia

- Location in Western Australia
- Interactive map of Nammuldi mine
- Location: Shire of Ashburton, Pilbara, Western Australia, Australia; 22°25′07″S 117°21′37″E
- Products: Iron ore
- Production: 6.6 million tonnes/annum
- Opened: 2006
- Company: Rio Tinto Iron Ore
- Website: Rio Tinto Iron Ore website

The Nammuldi mine is an iron ore mine located in the Pilbara region of Western Australia, 60 kilometres north-west of Tom Price.

The mine is fully owned and operated by Rio Tinto Iron Ore and is one of seventeen iron ore mines the company operates in the Pilbara. In 2009, the combined Pilbara operations produced 202 million tonnes of iron ore, a 15 percent increase from 2008. The Pilbara operations accounted for almost 13 percent of the world's 2009 iron ore production of 1.59 billion tonnes.

The Hamersley Range, where the mine is located, contains 80 percent of all identified iron ore reserves in Australia and is one of the world's major iron ore provinces.

== Overview ==
Iron ore mines in the Pilbara region

Rio Tinto's iron ore operations in the Pilbara began in 1966. The mine itself began operations in 2006, during a time when Rio Tinto increased the production output of its mines in the Pilbara due to increased demands. The mine has an annual production capacity of 6.6 million tonnes of iron ore, sourced from open-pit operations. The ore is processed on site before being loaded onto rail.

Ore from the mine is then transported to the coast through the Hamersley & Robe River railway, where it is loaded onto ships.

The mine's workforce is on a fly-in fly-out roster.

The mine is located near the Brockman mine, also operated by Rio Tinto. Rio Tinto briefly had to close the mine in February 2009, alongside Brockman, because of heavy rain and floods in the region.

From October 2015 all of the ore trucks on the site, and those at Yandicoogina mine are remotely controlled from Perth, 1,200 kilometres (750 mi) away. These are the world's first two mines that have moved all their iron ore "using fully remote-controlled trucks".

The mine is owned by Hamersley Iron Pty Ltd, a fully owned subsidiary of Rio Tinto, which owns six mines in the Pilbara, including Nammuldi, and partly owns two more mines in the region.
