= Mesa A mine =

Iron ore mine in Western Australia

- Location in Western Australia
- Interactive map of Mesa A mine
- Location: Shire of Ashburton, Pilbara, Western Australia, Australia; 21°40′12″S 115°54′14″E
- Products: Iron ore
- Production: 25,000,000 tonnes (25,000,000 long tons; 28,000,000 short tons)/annum
- Opened: 2010
- Company: Rio Tinto Iron Ore (53%) Mitsui & Co (33%) Nippon Steel (10.5%) Sumitomo Metal Industries (3.5%)
- Acquired: Rio Tinto: 2000

The Mesa A mine, sometimes also referred to as Waramboo mine, is an iron ore mine located in the Pilbara region of Western Australia, 50 km (31 mi) west of Pannawonica.

The mine is owned by Robe River Iron Associates (53% Rio Tinto) and operated by Rio Tinto Iron Ore and is one of twelve iron ore mines the company operates in the Pilbara. In 2009, the combined Pilbara operations produced 202,000,000 tonnes (199,000,000 long tons; 223,000,000 short tons) of iron ore, a 15 percent increase from 2008. The Pilbara operations accounted for almost 13 percent of the world's 2009 iron ore production of 1,590,000,000 tonnes (1.56×10^{9} long tons; 1.75×10^{9} short tons).

The Hamersley Range, where the mine is located, contains 80 percent of all identified iron ore reserves in Australia and is one of the world's major iron ore provinces.

== Overview ==
Iron ore mines in the Pilbara region

Rio Tinto iron ore operations in the Pilbara began in 1966. The mine itself began operations in 2010. Operation of the mine was contracted to HWE Mining. The mine has an annual production capacity of 25,000,000 tonnes (25,000,000 long tons; 28,000,000 short tons) of iron ore, sourced from open-pit operations. The ore is processed on site before being loaded onto rail.

Ore from the mine is then transported to the coast through the Hamersley & Robe River railway line, where it is loaded onto ships.

The mine's workforce is on a fly-in fly-out roster.

The mine is located near the Mesa J mine. The new Mesa A mine was scheduled to replace the Mesa J mine which was nearing the end of its life span. Due to additional deposits found near the existing Mesa J site, a decision was made to operate the Mesa A mine as a fly-in fly-out site. The Mesa J site could then continue to run as a residential site based in Pannawonica. After a two-year construction period and expenses of $1 billion, the mine began operation in February 2010. The mine was initially scheduled for a mine life of eleven years. But has now been extended due to an expansion for the mining of Mesa B and Mesa C deposits.

== Robe River Iron Associates ==
Robe River Iron, owner of the mine, is jointly owned by:

- Rio Tinto – 53% – operator
- Mitsui & Co – 33%
- Nippon Steel – 10.5%
- Sumitomo Metal Industries – 3.5%

Robe River Iron operates the West Angelas, Mesa A and Mesa J mines. Rio Tinto acquired its share of 53% in late 2000, when it took over mining company North Limited.
