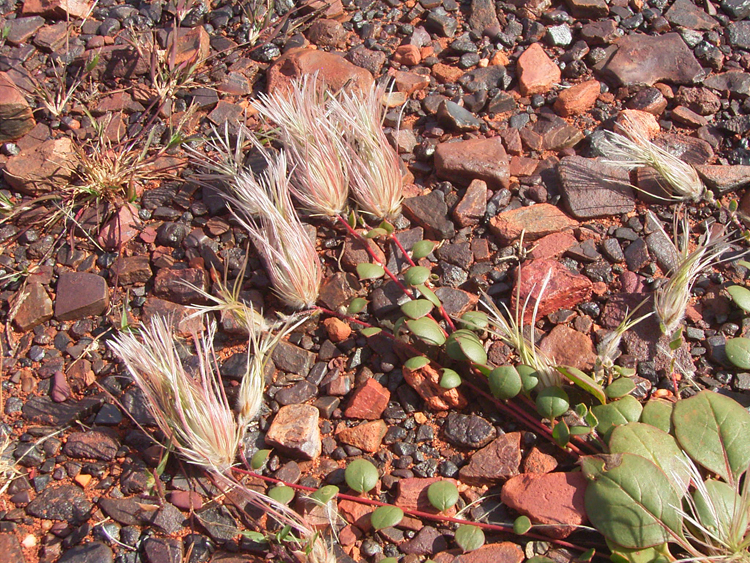
- Near the Paraburdoo mine

Conservation status
- Priority Four — Rare Taxa (DEC)

Scientific classification
- Kingdom: Plantae
- Clade: Embryophytes
- Clade: Tracheophytes
- Clade: Spermatophytes
- Clade: Angiosperms
- Clade: Eudicots
- Order: Caryophyllales
- Family: Amaranthaceae
- Genus: Ptilotus
- Species: P. trichocephalus

Binomial name
- Ptilotus trichocephalus Benl

= Ptilotus trichocephalus =

Species of plant

Ptilotus trichocephalus is a species of flowering plant of the family Amaranthaceae and is endemic to the north-west of Western Australia. It is a prostrate, spreading perennial herb with several stems, leaves at the base of the plant, stem leaves arranged alternately, and oval, cylindrical or hemispherical spikes of green, densely arranged flowers.

== Description ==
Ptilotus trichocephalus is a prostrate, perennial herb with several stems that become glabrous with age. There is a rosette of leaves at the base of the plant and stem-leaves 5–60 mm (0.20–2.36 in) long and 2–27 mm (0.079–1.063 in) wide that become glabrous with age. The flowers are borne in a green oval, cylindrical or hemispherical spike, sometimes in clusters of spikes, the bracts 8–11 mm (0.31–0.43 in) long with an obscure midrib, the bracteoles 13–19 mm (0.51–0.75 in) long, both with a prominent midrib. The outer tepals are mostly 44–62 mm (1.7–2.4 in) long, and the inner tepals 22–42 mm (0.87–1.65 in) long. The style is curved, 1.1 mm (0.043 in) long and fixed to the side of the ovary.

== Taxonomy ==
Ptilotus trichocephalus was first formally described in 1990 by Gerhard Benl in the journal Botanische Staatssammlung München from specimens collected 3 km (1.9 mi) south of Peak Bore in Mount James Station, via Meekatharra in 1973. The specific epithet (trichocephalus) means 'hair-headed'.

== Distribution and habitat ==
This species of Ptilotus grows in sandy soils on colluvium plains in the Gascoyne and Pilbata bioregions of north-western Western Australia.

== Conservation status ==
Ptilotus trichocephalus is listed as "Priority Four" by the Government of Western Australia Department of Biodiversity, Conservation and Attractions, meaning that it is rare or near threatened.
