= Hamersley & Robe River railway line =

Private railway in Pilbara region of Western Australia

Hamersley & Robe River Railway
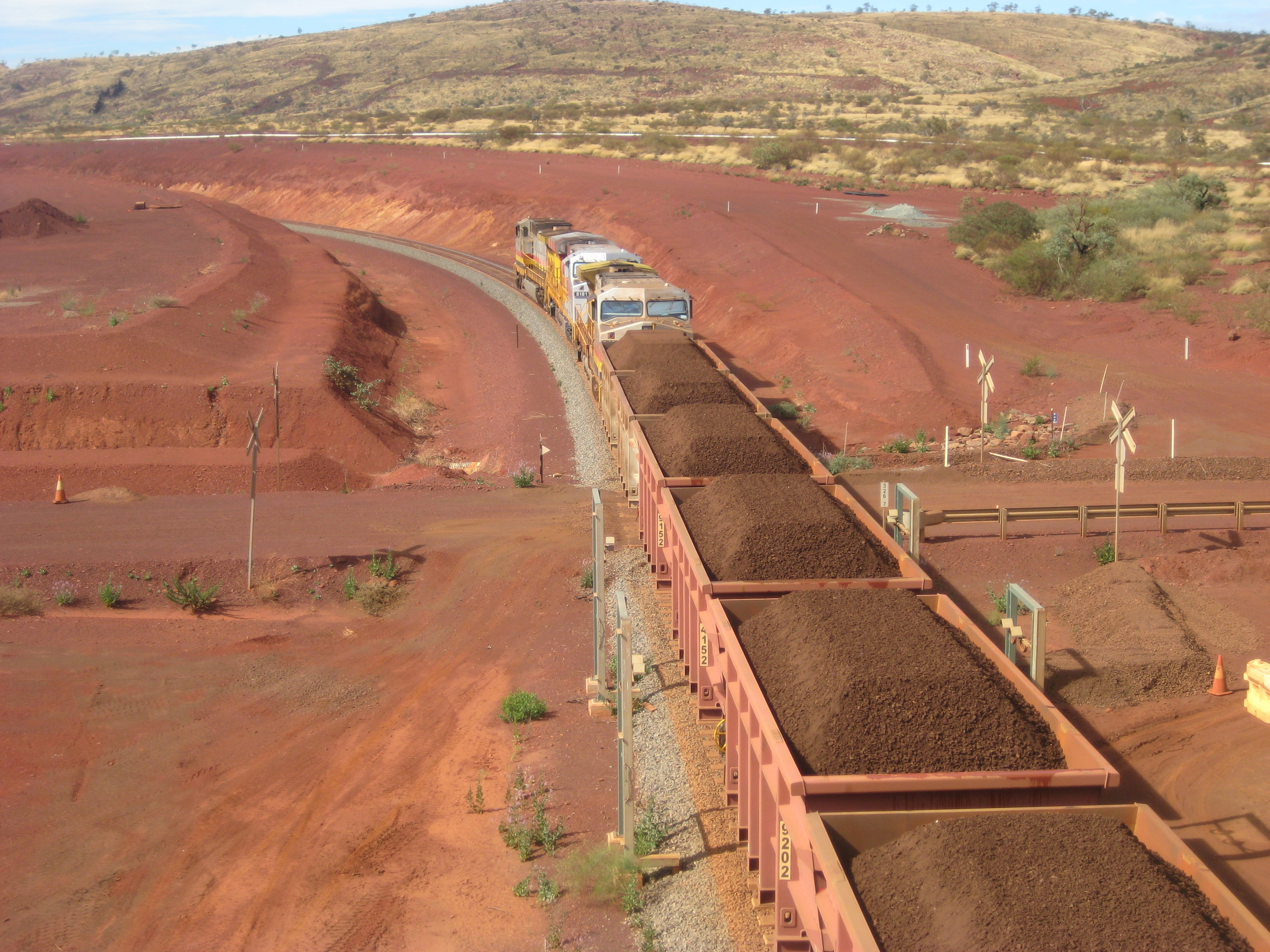
- Iron ore train leaving the Brockman 4 mine in June 2012

Overview
- Status: Operational
- Locale: Pilbara, Western Australia
- Termini: Mesa J, Brockman, Paraburdoo, West Angelas, Hope Downs, Yandi mines; Dampier, Cape Lambert

Service
- Type: Heavy rail
- System: Pilbara
- Operator: Rio Tinto
- Depot(s): Tom Price; Cape Lambert; Dampier

History
- Opened: 1 July 1966

Technical
- Line length: 1,700 km (1,056 mi)
- Track gauge: 1,435 mm (4 ft 8 1/2 in)
- Train protection system: ETCS Level 2 with GoA4

The Hamersley & Robe River railway, majority-owned by Rio Tinto, and operated by its subsidiary Pilbara Iron, is a private rail network in the Pilbara region of Western Australia for the purpose of carrying iron ore. The network is larger than any other Australian heavy freight rail network in private ownership. The total length of its track is about 1,700 km (1,056 mi).

There are four other iron ore rail lines in the Pilbara. BHP operate the Goldsworthy and Mount Newman railways, Fortescue Metals Group operate the Fortescue railway and Hancock Prospecting the Roy Hill railway.

== History ==
Railways in the Pilbara region. The Hamersley & Robe River Railway is in green .

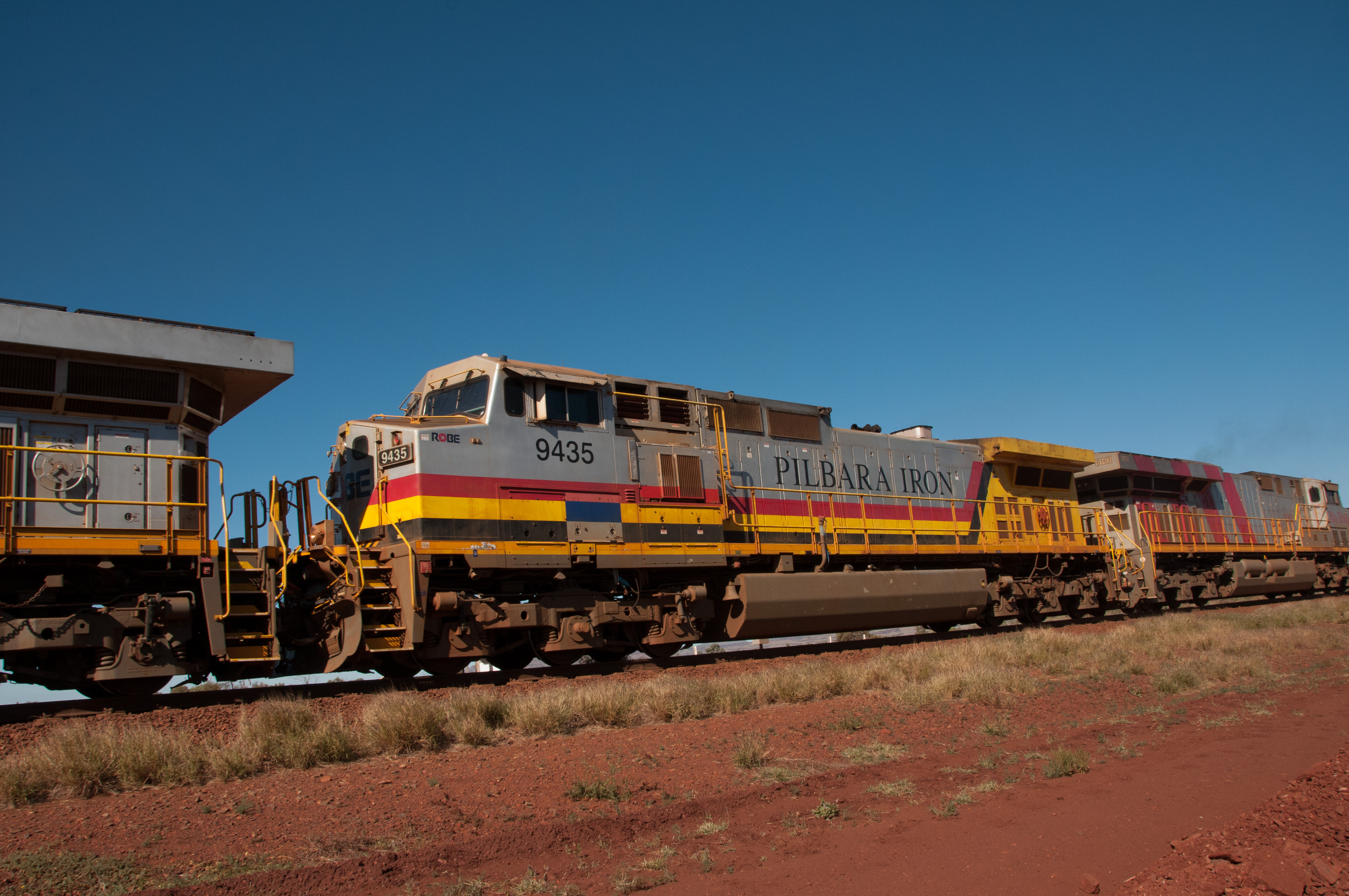
GE Transportation Dash 9-44CW 9435 in August 2013

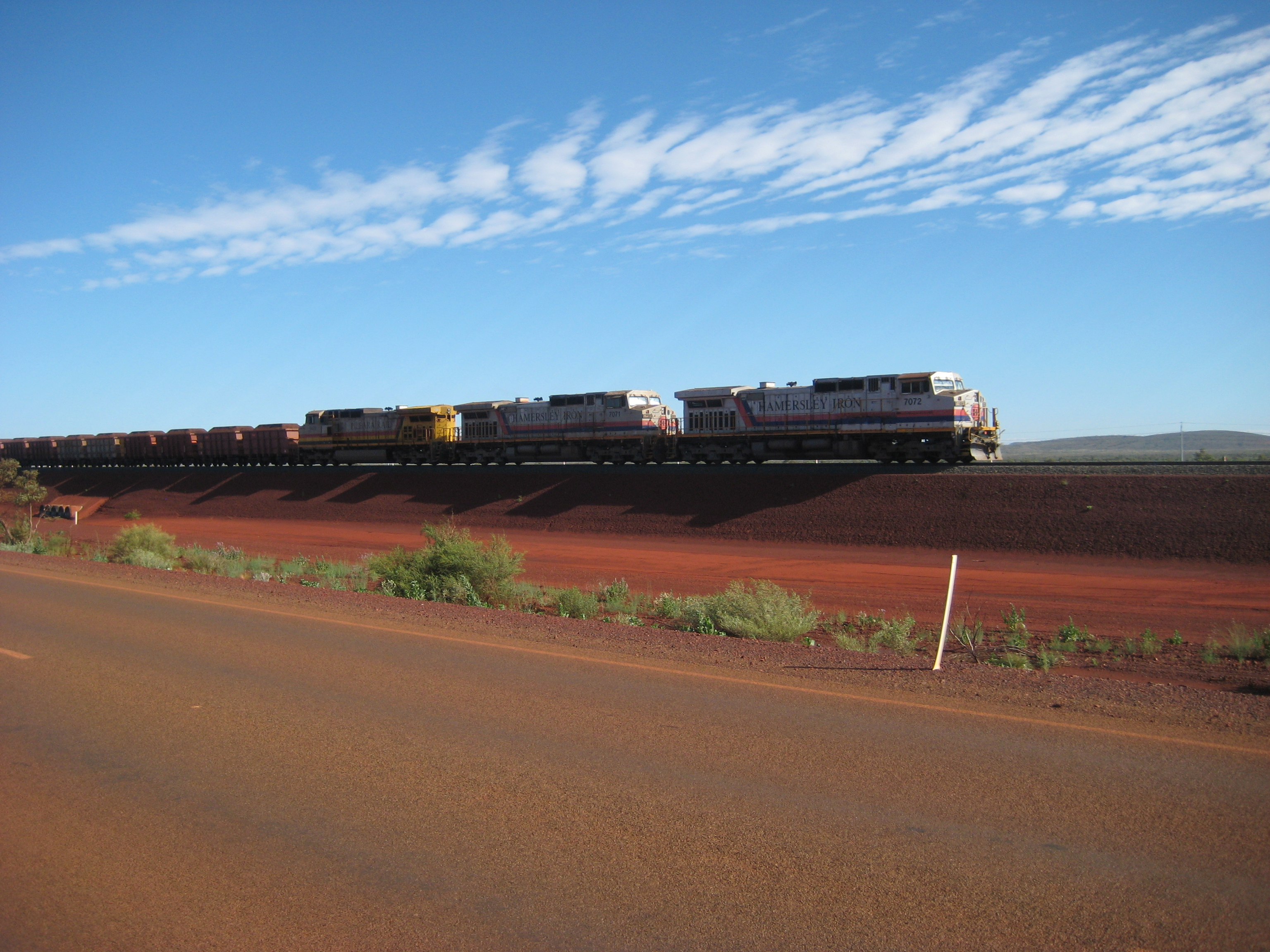
Iron ore train leaving the Brockman 4 mine in April 2011

=== Hamersley railway ===
The first part of the Pilbara Iron rail network to be constructed was a line known as the Hamersley railway, between a newly opened mine at Tom Price and a newly constructed port (now the port of Dampier) at King Bay.

The Hamersley railway project began in December 1964, when Japanese steel mills agreed to purchase iron ore from Hamersley Iron over 16 years beginning in August 1966. The railway's route was chosen after two aerial surveys and comparisons of numerous possible alternatives.

In April 1965, a joint venture of Morrison-Knudsen, Mannix Contractors of Canada and McDonald Constructions of Australia was appointed to build the line of 180 miles, for $15,680,000. Excavations commenced at Dampier on 16 June 1965. Until the completion of a service wharf at that location, cargo had to be brought ashore on lighters, or unloaded at Point Samson. On 6 September 1965, the freighter Katsura Maru became the first vessel to berth at the service wharf; its cargo included the railway's first four locomotives.

The original track for the Hamersley railway was 59 kg/m (119 lb/yd) rails manufactured in Japan, laid on sleepers of jarrah and wandoo timber from Western Australia with dog spike fastenings and ballasted with 15.2 cm (6 in) of crushed stone. For most of the construction period, track was laid at a rate of 2.4 km (1.5 mi) per day. On 23 June 1966, the first ore train ran from Tom Price to the coast, and on 1 July 1966 the line was officially opened by the Minister for Industrial Development, Charles Court.

In 1970, construction began on an extension of the Hamersley railway from Wombat Junction, just north of Tom Price, to a second mine, at Paraburdoo, about 64 km (40 mi) south west of Tom Price. Engineering design and construction management for the extension was undertaken by Minenco; the contractors were a joint venture known as Morrison-Knudsen-Mannix-Oman (MKMO). The Paraburdoo extension incorporated a number of design improvements. In particular, the track was made from heavier, 68 kg/m (137 lb/yd) rail sections, which were flashbutt and thermit welded into continuous rails, and attached by pandrol clips to timber sleepers. Construction was completed in March 1972, and the first official Paraburdoo train ran on 5 May 1972.

In 1972, a programme of rerailing the original railway began. In that year, 12 km (7 mi) of 59 kg/m (119 lb/yd) track and dog spikes were replaced with 68 kg/m (137 lb/yd) track and pandrol clips. The replacement programme continued until its completion in 1977. Hamersley Iron also arranged for test installation of concrete sleepers at various locations from November 1973. The tests were successful, and in 1980 work commenced on the re-sleepering of the original railway with concrete sleepers, a task completed in 1986.

The Hamersley railway was subsequently expanded with the construction of spur lines to Marandoo, Brockman and the Yandicoogina mines.

=== Robe River railway ===
The other main component of the Pilbara Iron network is the Robe River railway, which was constructed for a joint venture known as Cliffs Robe River Iron Associates. This railway originally linked the joint venture's first mine, near Pannawonica in the Robe River valley, with a pelletising plant and port at Cape Lambert.

The Robe River railway project was given the go ahead on 1 July 1970. The construction contract was awarded to the MKMO joint venture. In May 1971, the first track materials were unloaded at the service wharf at Cape Lambert. Tracklaying from Cape Lambert to Pannawonica then proceeded between January and May 1972. The first Robe River ore train, operating under test conditions, ran on 6 July 1972. The first official train carrying production ore followed on 8 August 1972; it consisted of 75 wagons hauled by two locomotives. One week later, the Robe River railway was finally accepted from the contractor.

=== Pilbara Iron ===
In 2001, after taking over North Limited the majority owner of Robe River Iron, Rio Tinto merged the Hamersley and Robe River rail operations under the Pilbara Rail banner. The merger generated more than $16 million in savings. In 2004, Rio Tinto announced that Hamersley and Robe would start merging the rest of its operations under a new Pilbara Iron entity. Pilbara Rail was folded into Pilbara Iron in 2005.

As of 2020, the Pilbara Iron network served 11 mines in the Pilbara region, transporting 333 million tonnes of iron ore to the ports at Dampier and Cape Lambert annually.

In November 2007, the National Competition Council of Australia received an application from Fortescue Metals Group (FMG) to access part of the Hamersley railway. In January 2008, another application was lodged by FMG, this time for access to the Robe River railway. Earlier, in June 2004, the council had received an application from FMG to use of part of BHP's Mount Newman railway and also part of the Goldsworthy railway.

In May 2008, Rio Tinto suffered a setback when the Federal Court of Australia rejected an attempt by Rio to block Fortescue from using their rail network. Following this, in June 2010, the Australian Competition Tribunal ruled that Fortescue would be granted access to the Robe River line and BHP Billiton's Goldsworthy line but not to the busier Hamersley and Mount Newman lines. Treasurer Wayne Swan suggested that several advantages would accrue from access to the rail lines by third parties. It would increase competition, reduce duplication of infrastructure, and reduce environmental damage.

Access to the rail networks by third parties is governed by the State Agreements Act.

== Operations ==
Rio Tinto iron ore trains consist of up to 236 wagons, each having a load capacity of up to 116 tonnes. Trains are up to 2.4 kilometres (1.5 mi) long and, fully loaded, weigh approximately 29,500 tonnes. The trains have an average cycle time of 28 hours.

== Rolling stock ==
=== Hamersley Iron locomotives ===
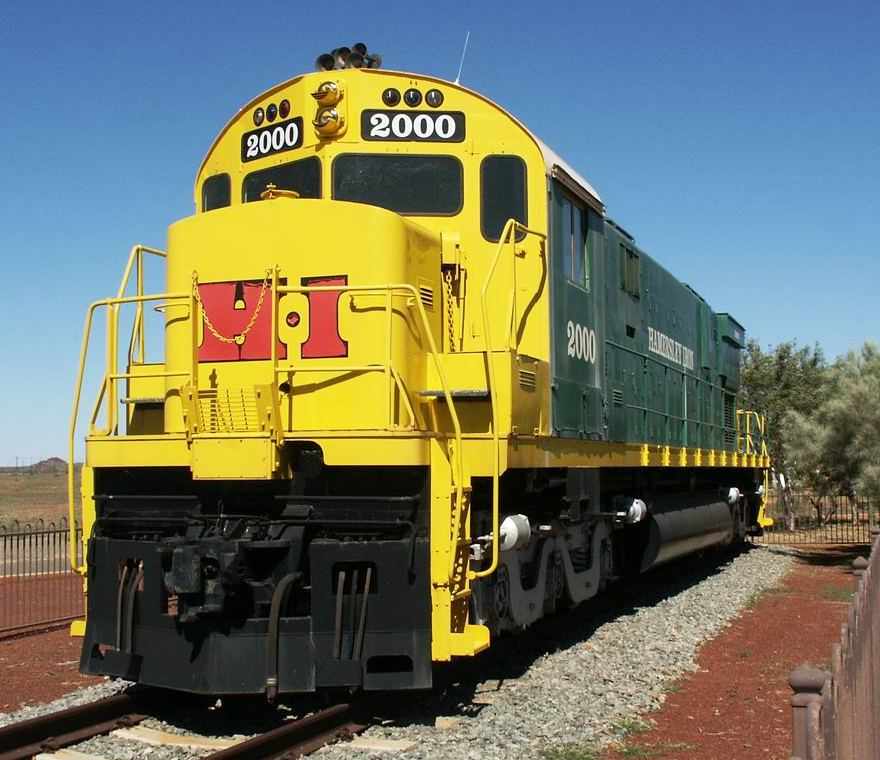
A retired Hamersley Iron Alco C-628 locomotive at 7 Mile Yard, Dampier in July 2003

To operate construction trains, Hamersley Iron purchased a former Spokane, Portland and Seattle Railway Alco S-2 shunter (007). To haul the iron ore trains, five Alco C-628 locomotives (2001–2005) were purchased in 1965–67, two being built in Schenectady in the United States and three by AE Goodwin in Sydney. All had been retired by 1982 with one preserved on a plinth at 7 Mile Yard. Three 2,750hp 175 ton diesel electric locomotives were shipped from San Francisco in September 1965.

In May 1968, a two-year-old former demonstrator Alco C-415 (008, later 1000) was purchased. After being withdrawn in February 1982 and donated to the Pilbara Railway Historical Society, it was reactivated in September 1991 to operate construction trains on the under construction Marandoo line.

In May 1968, the first two, of what by 1980 would total 39 (3006–3017), (4030–4056), Alco C-636s (3006–3017) and MLW M-636s (4030–4056) were delivered. The earlier deliveries were manufactured by AE Goodwin, with the later examples manufactured by Commonwealth Engineering.

In April 1978, three Class 50 GE Transportation C36-7s (5057–5059) manufactured by A Goninan & Co, Broadmeadow were delivered. These were withdrawn in 1997 and in August 1998 sold to National Railway Equipment Company and exported to the United States. All were leased to the Norfolk Southern Railway. In 2006 one was sold to the Minnesota Commercial Railroad and the other two to FIAGRIL, a soy company in Brazil that had an agreement of transport with Ferronorte; the former 5058 is now owned by ABPF, the Brazilian Preservation Railway Association, and has run on touristic and special trains.

Between 1981 and 1985, 24 were rebuilt by Comeng, Bassendean with new cabs as CE636Rs. Most were withdrawn in 1995, with 10 sold to Austrac Ready Power and shipped to Perth for an aborted rebuild. One (3017) has been preserved by the Pilbara Railway Historical Society.

Accompanying the three Class 50s on the voyage from Newcastle, was former Great Western Railway steam locomotive Pendennis Castle that had been purchased by Hamersley Iron. Until its October 1994 withdrawal, Pendennis Castle' operated charter services on the Hamersley Iron network hauling former New South Wales Government Railways S type passenger carriages. Rio Tinto donated the locomotive to the Great Western Society, Didcot and in April 2000 was repatriated back to England.

In 1982, five Class 60 Electro-Motive Diesel SD50Ss (6060–6064) were manufactured by Clyde Engineering, Rosewater. In November 1995, all were withdrawn and in August 1998 sold to National Railway Equipment Company and exported to the United States. After being leased to Norfolk Southern all were sold in 2001 to the Utah Railway.

=== Robe River locomotives ===
In August 1971, Cliffs Robe River Iron Associates (CRRIA) took delivery two New South Wales 40 class locomotives (9401 & 9405) to operate construction trains. After the line opened they were used as shunters at Cape Lambert until withdrawn in 1979. 9405 was donated to the Pilbara Railways Historical Society and returned to working order, while 9401 was donated to the Wickham Lions Club and placed on a plinth at the tourist information bay.

Between October 1971 and June 1980, CRRIA took delivery of 12 MLW M-636 locomotives (9410-9416 & 9421–9425). In May 1981, another (9424) was purchased second hand from the Burlington Northern Railroad. In 1986, a further two were purchased from Conrail and rebuilt as CE636Rs at Comeng, Bassendean before entering service as 9426 and 9427. In May 1989, another (9417) was purchased from Burlington North Railroad and rebuilt by A Goninan & Co, Perth. Between June 1989 and April 1996, a further 12 were rebuilt by A Goninan & Co as CM40-8Ms. In 2012 some were sold to Chicago Freight Car Leasing Australia and taken to UGL Rail, Perth for overhaul. Only one has entered service.

In January 1975, four 1965 built ex Chesapeake and Ohio Railway Alco C-630 locomotives (9417–9420) were delivered to CRRIA One (9417) was destroyed in an accident in February 1979, with the remaining three rebuilt by A Goninan & Co to the same specifications as the replacement 9417 in 1990/91.

=== Rio Tinto locomotives ===
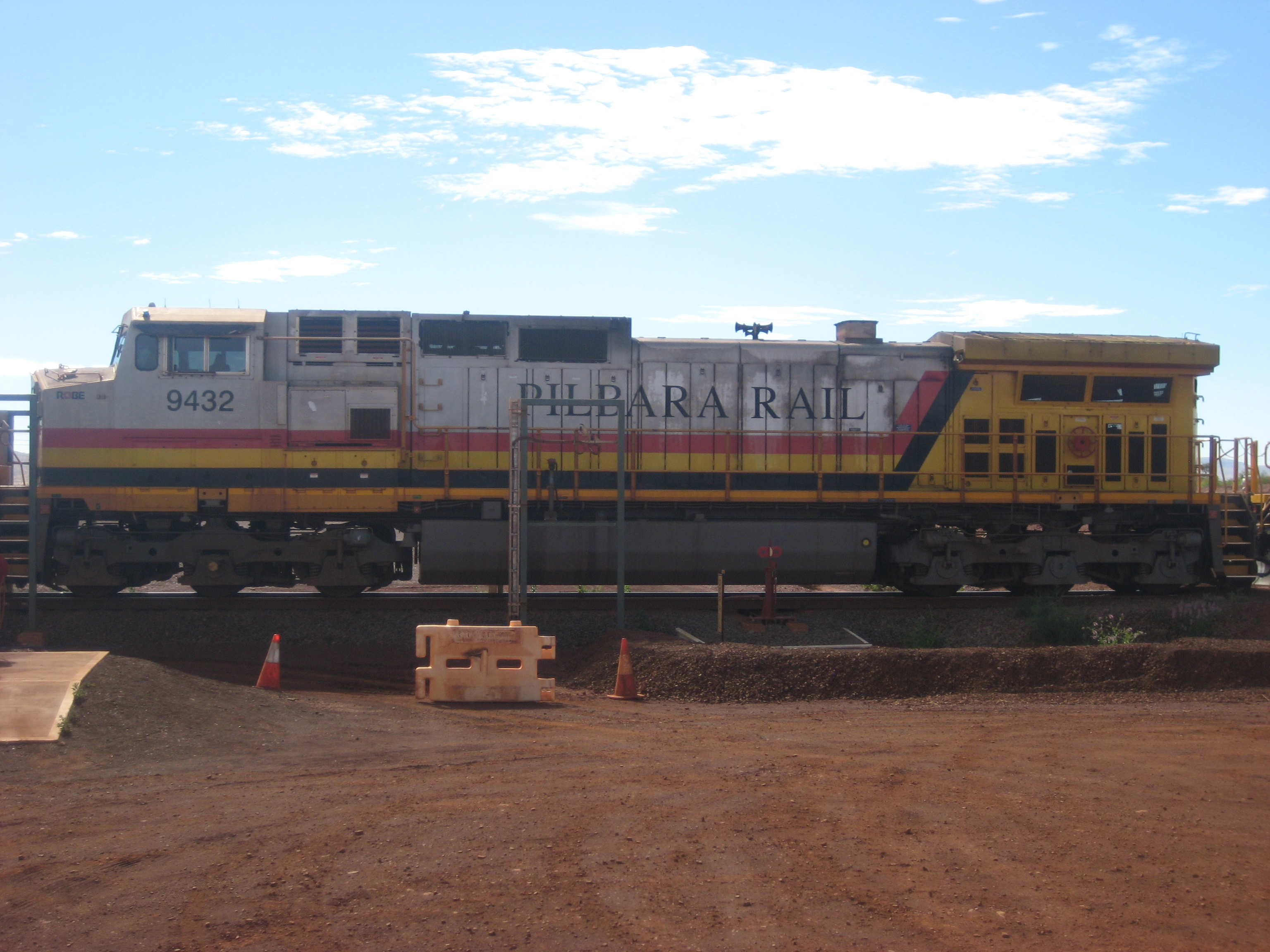
GE Dash 9-44CW 9435 at Brockman 4 mine in June 2012

In February 1995, 29 GE Transportation Dash 9-44CWs were delivered in one shipment from Erie, Pennsylvania. Because 13 had been deck cargo, they received corrosion damage and required remedial attention before entering service. Further orders brought the total to 72 (7043–7050, 7053–7098, 9401-9409 & 9428–9436).

Since 2007, 97 GE Transportation ES44DCis (8100–8196) have been delivered.

=== Autohaul ===
A decades long $1.7B project to automate the over two hundred Rio Tinto locomotives used to haul Pilbara Iron ore was completed in 2020. "AutoHaul" is the world's first autonomous trains network reaching operational status, and is self-characterized as "the world's largest robot". The trains are monitored from operations centre in Perth, over 1,500 km away. Some drivers are retained as manual backup and to drive trains the last mile into the port area.

== Depots ==
Rail depots are located at Tom Price, Cape Lambert and Dampier while the train control is based in Perth.

== Mines ==
The Pilbara Iron rail network transports ore from the following Rio Tinto-operated mines to the ports at Dampier and Cape Lambert:

- Brockman 2 mine
- Brockman 4 mine
- Nammuldi mine
- Mount Tom Price mine
- Marandoo mine
- Mesa A mine
- Mesa J mine
- Paraburdoo mine
- Channar mine (ore transported to Paraburdoo by conveyor)
- Eastern Range mine (ore transported to Paraburdoo by conveyor)
- West Angelas mine
- Yandicoogina mine
- Hope Downs mine
- Hope Downs 4 mine
