= Brockman 2 mine =

Iron ore mine in Western Australia

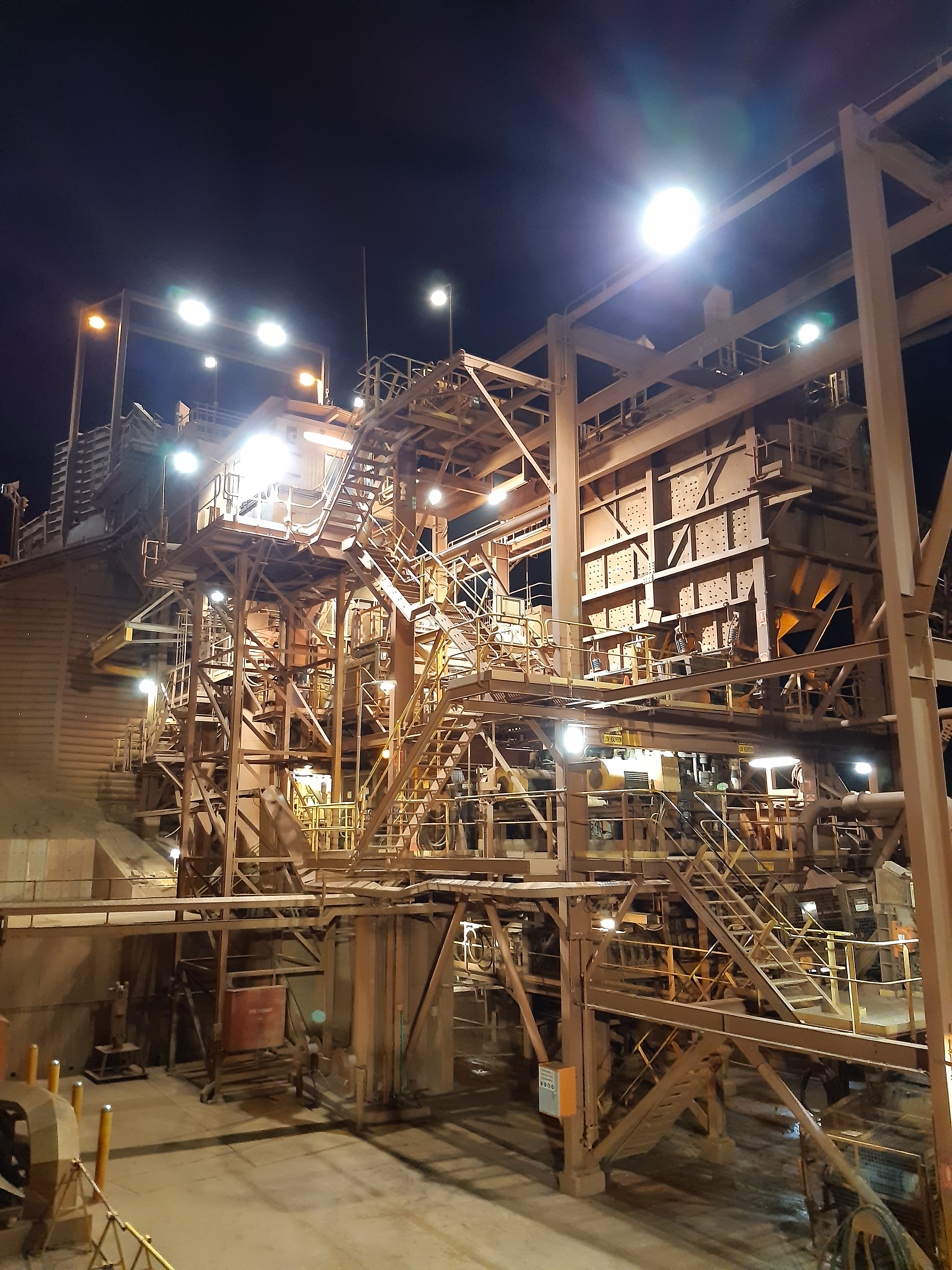
- The primary crusher at the mine by night

- Location in Western Australia
- Interactive map of Brockman 2 mine
- Location: Shire of Ashburton, Pilbara, Western Australia, Australia; 22°25′38″S 117°20′29″E
- Products: Iron ore
- Production: 8.7 million tonnes/annum
- Opened: 1992
- Company: Rio Tinto Iron Ore
- Website: Rio Tinto Iron Ore website

The Brockman 2 mine is an iron ore mine located in the Pilbara region of Western Australia, 60 kilometres north-west of Tom Price.

The mine is fully owned and operated by Rio Tinto Iron Ore and is one of twelve iron ore mines the company operates in the Pilbara. In 2009, the combined Pilbara operations produced 202 million tonnes of iron ore, a 15 percent increase from 2008. The Pilbara operations accounted for almost 13 percent of the world's 2009 iron ore production of 1.59 billion tonnes.

The Hamersley Range, where the mine is located, contains 80 percent of all identified iron ore reserves in Australia and is one of the world's major iron ore provinces.

The mine is serviced by the Brockman Airport.

== Overview ==
Iron ore mines in the Pilbara region

Rio Tinto iron ore operations in the Pilbara began in 1966. The mine itself began operations in 1992. The mine has an annual production capacity of 8.7 million tonnes of iron ore, sourced from open-pit operations. The ore is processed on site before being loaded onto rail. Ore from the mine is then transported to the coast through the Hamersley & Robe River railway, where it is loaded onto ships. Ore from Brockman, like that from Mount Tom Price, Paraburdoo, Channar, Eastern Range, Marandoo and Yandicoogina, is transported as lump and fines ore product from the mines to Dampier via rail. Before being loaded onto ships for export, the product is blended and re-screened. The maximum size for the lumps is 31.5 mm, while the fines are at a maximum of 6.3 mm.

The mine's workforce is on a fly-in fly-out roster. In 2009, the mine employed 539 people, an increase in comparison to 2008, when it only employed 445.

The mine is located near the Nammuldi mine, also operated by Rio Tinto.

Like the Channar mine, Brockman 2 was closed for a time in late 2008 during the Great Recession, with the operation mothballed. The temporary closure, which halted its then monthly production of 1.6 million tonnes, came alongside selected production reductions at Rio Tinto's other Pilbara operations.

The mine is owned by Hamersley Iron Pty Ltd, a fully owned subsidiary of Rio Tinto, which owns six mines in the Pilbara, including Brockman, as well as partly owning two others in the region.

On 16 August 2011, an employee was killed at the mine, being crushed by a hydraulic cylinder of a front-end loader, causing operations to be stopped for a number of days. It was the second fatality in less than three month in Rio Tinto's Pilbara operations, after having been fatality-free since August 2003.

== Brockman 4 ==
Rio Tinto's new Brockman 4 project is located close to the current Brockman 2 mine. It is a separate mine to the current one and opened in 2010. The mine, at a cost of US$1.520 billion, is initially scheduled to produce 22 million tonnes annually, with a later doubling of capacity to achieve Rio Tinto's plan of raising iron ore production from the Pilbara from 220 million tonnes annually to 330 million.
