= Eastern Range mine =

Iron ore mine in Western Australia

- Location in Western Australia
- Interactive map of Eastern Range mine
- Location: Shire of Ashburton, Pilbara, Western Australia, Australia; 23°18′48″S 117°47′06″E
- Products: Iron ore
- Production: 20 million tonnes/annum
- Opened: 2004
- Company: Rio Tinto Iron Ore (54%) Shanghai Baosteel (46%)
- Website: Rio Tinto Iron Ore website

The Eastern Range mine is an iron ore mine in the Pilbara region of Western Australia, 10 kilometres south-east of Paraburdoo.

The mine is partly owned and operated by Rio Tinto Iron Ore and is one of twelve iron ore mines the company operates in the Pilbara. In 2009, the combined Pilbara operations produced 202 million tonnes of iron ore, a 15 percent increase from 2008. The Pilbara operations accounted for almost 13 percent of the world's 2009 iron ore production of 1.59 billion tonnes.

The Hamersley Range, where the mine is located, contains 80 percent of all identified iron ore reserves in Australia and is one of the world's major iron ore provinces.

== Overview ==
Iron ore mines in the Pilbara region

Rio Tinto iron ore operations in the Pilbara began in 1966. The mine itself began operations in 2004. The combined production capacity of the Paraburdoo, Eastern Range and Channar mines is 20 million tonnes of iron ore. The ore is processed both at Eastern Range and at Paraburdoo before being loaded onto rail, being transported from Eastern Range to Paraburdoo by conveyor belt.

Ore from the mine is then transported to the coast through the Hamersley & Robe River railway, where it is loaded onto ships. Ore from Eastern Range, like Brockman, Mount Tom Price, Paraburdoo, Channar, Marandoo and Yandicoogina are transported as lump and fines ore product from the mines to Dampier via rail. Before being loaded onto ships for export, the product is blended and rescreened. The maximum size for the lumps is 31.5 mm, while the fines are at a maximum of 6.3 mm.

The mine's workforce lives residential in Paraburdoo. In 2009, the combined operations of Paraburdoo, Channar and Eastern Range employed 1,081 people, a decrease in comparison to 2008, when it employed 1,324.

The mine is jointly owned by Rio Tinto, who holds 54% and Chinese company Shanghai Baosteel Group Corporation, who owns the remaining 46%. Shanghai Baosteel acquired its share in the mine in April 2004 in order to secure a long-term, stable supply of resources for the Chinese economy. Rio Tinto's share of the mine is owned through Hamersley Iron Pty Ltd, a fully owned subsidiary, which owns six mines in the Pilbara, and partly owns two more mines in the region, including Eastern Range.

While the Eastern Range deposit was known for two decades, it took China's emergence as a major steel producer and oversees investor to develop the mine.
