= Paraburdoo mine =

Iron ore mine in Western Australia

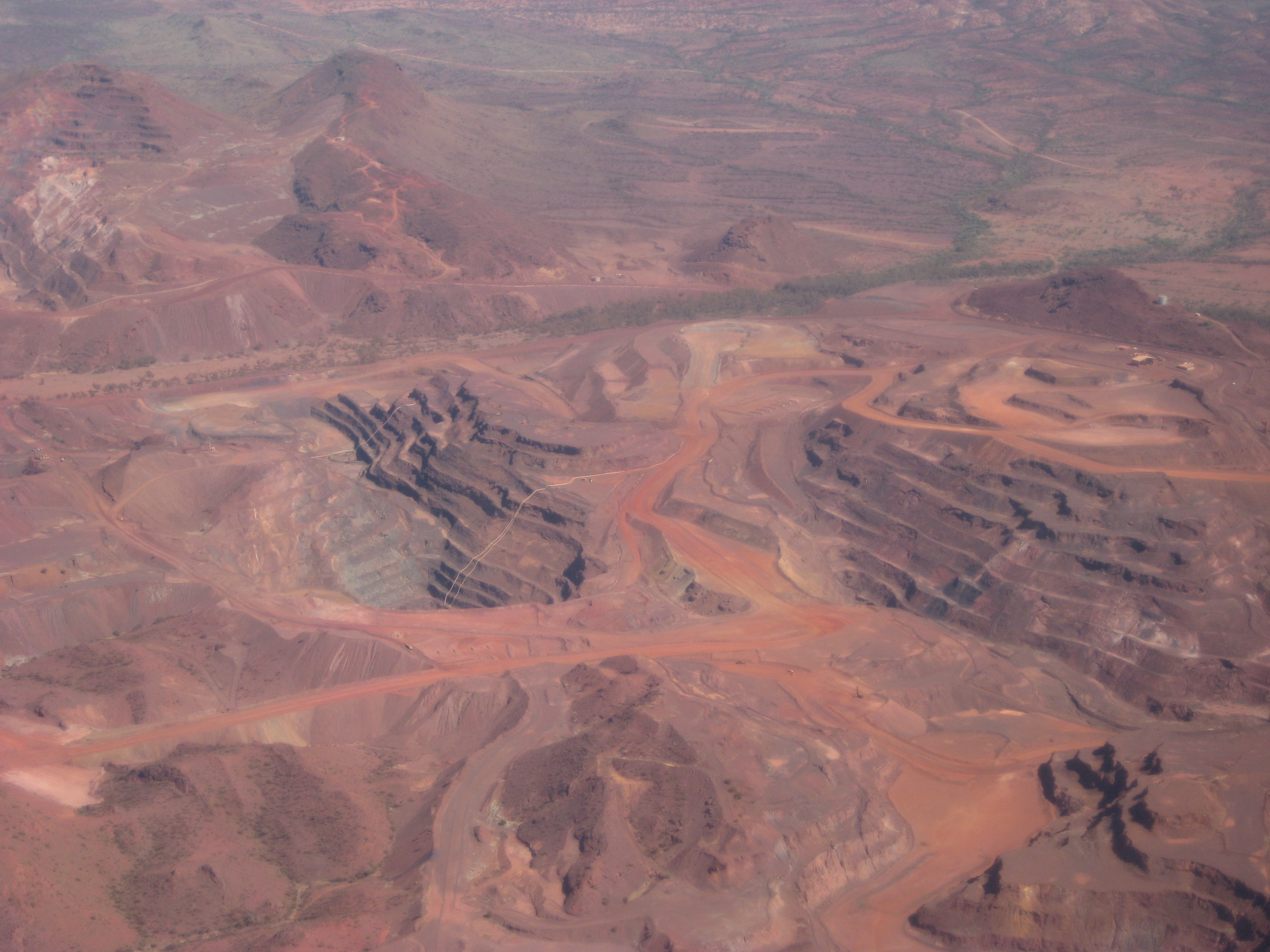
- The Paraburdoo mine in October 2011.

- Location in Western Australia
- Interactive map of Paraburdoo mine
- Location: Shire of Ashburton, Pilbara, Western Australia, Australia; 23°13′36″S 117°36′30″E
- Products: Iron ore
- Opened: 1972
- Company: Rio Tinto
- Website: www.riotinto.com

The Paraburdoo mine is an iron ore mine located in the Pilbara region of Western Australia, near Paraburdoo.

The mine is owned and operated by Rio Tinto, and is one of twelve iron ore mines the company operates in the Pilbara. In 2009, the combined Pilbara operations produced 202 million tonnes of iron ore, a 15% increase over 2008. The Pilbara operations accounted for almost 13% of the world's 2009 iron ore production of 1.59 billion tonnes.

The Hamersley Range, where the mine is located, contains 80% of all identified iron ore reserves in Australia and is one of the world's major iron ore provinces.

== Overview ==
Iron ore mines in the Pilbara region

Rio Tinto's iron ore operations in the Pilbara began in 1966. The mine itself began operations in 1972. The combined production capacity of the Paraburdoo, Eastern Range and Channar mines is 20 million tonnes of iron ore. The ore is processed on site before being loaded onto rail. Ore from Paraburdoo, like Brockman, Mount Tom Price, Channar, Eastern Range, Marandoo and Yandicoogina are transported as lump and fines ore product from the mines to Dampier via rail. Before being loaded onto ships for export, the product is blended and rescreened. The maximum size for the lumps is 31.5 mm, while the fines are at a maximum of 6.3 mm.

Ore from the mine is then transported to the coast via the Hamersley & Robe River railway line, where it is loaded onto ships.

The mine's workforce lives in Paraburdoo. In 2009, the combined operations of Paraburdoo, Channar and Eastern Range employed 1,081 people, a decrease compared to 2008 when it employed 1,324.

The mine is owned by Hamersley Iron, a subsidiary of Rio Tinto, which owns six mines in the Pilbara, including Paraburdoo, and partly owns two more mines in the region.
