= Yandicoogina mine =

Iron ore mine in Western Australia

- Location in Western Australia
- Interactive map of Yandicoogina mine
- Location: Shire of East Pilbara, Pilbara, Western Australia, Australia; 22°46′09″S 119°13′49″E
- Products: Iron ore
- Production: 52 million tonnes/annum
- Opened: 1998
- Company: Rio Tinto Iron Ore
- Website: Rio Tinto Iron Ore website

The Yandicoogina mine, often shortened to Yandi, is an iron ore mine located in the Pilbara region of Western Australia, 95 kilometres north-west of Newman. it should not be confused with BHP Billiton's Yandi mine, which is located nearby.

The mine is fully owned and operated by Rio Tinto Iron Ore and is one of twelve iron ore mines the company operates in the Pilbara. In 2009, the combined Pilbara operations produced 202 million tonnes of iron ore, a 15 percent increase from 2008. The Pilbara operations accounted for almost 13 percent of the world's 2009 iron ore production of 1.59 billion tonnes.

The Hamersley Range, where the mine is located, contains 80 percent of all identified iron ore reserves in Australia and is one of the world's major iron ore provinces.

== Overview ==
Iron ore mines in the Pilbara region

Rio Tinto's iron ore operations in the Pilbara began in 1966. The mine itself began operations in 1998. The mine has an annual production capacity of 52 million tonnes of iron ore, sourced from open-pit operations. The ore is processed on site before being loaded onto rail.

Ore from the mine is then transported to the coast through the Hamersley & Robe River railway, where it is loaded onto ships. Ore from Yandicoogina, like Brockman, Mount Tom Price, Paraburdoo, Channar, Eastern Range and Marandoo are transported as lump and fines ore product from the mines to Dampier via rail. Before being loaded onto ships for export, the product is blended and rescreened. The maximum size for the lumps is 31.5 mm, while the fines are at a maximum of 6.3 mm.

The mine's workforce is on a fly-in fly-out roster. In 2009, the mine employed 953 people, a slight decrease in comparison to 2008, when it employed 957.

In September 2010, Rio Tinto began operating flights from Derby in order to bolster its workforce at its mines located in the Pilbara and especially at the Yandicoogina mine. It is part of a program to fly Aboriginal Rio Tinto employees from their communities like Meekatharra, Nullagine, Carnarvon and Broome to their workplace at the mines.

From October 2015 all 22 of the ore trucks on the site, and those at the Nammuldi mine, are remotely controlled from Perth, 1,200 kilometres (750 mi) away. These are the world's first two mines that have moved all their iron ore "using fully remote-controlled trucks".

The mine is owned by Hamersley Iron Pty Ltd, a fully owned subsidiary of Rio Tinto, which owns six mines in the Pilbara, including Yandicoogina, and partly owns two more in the region.
