= Mount Tom Price mine =

Iron ore mine in Western Australia

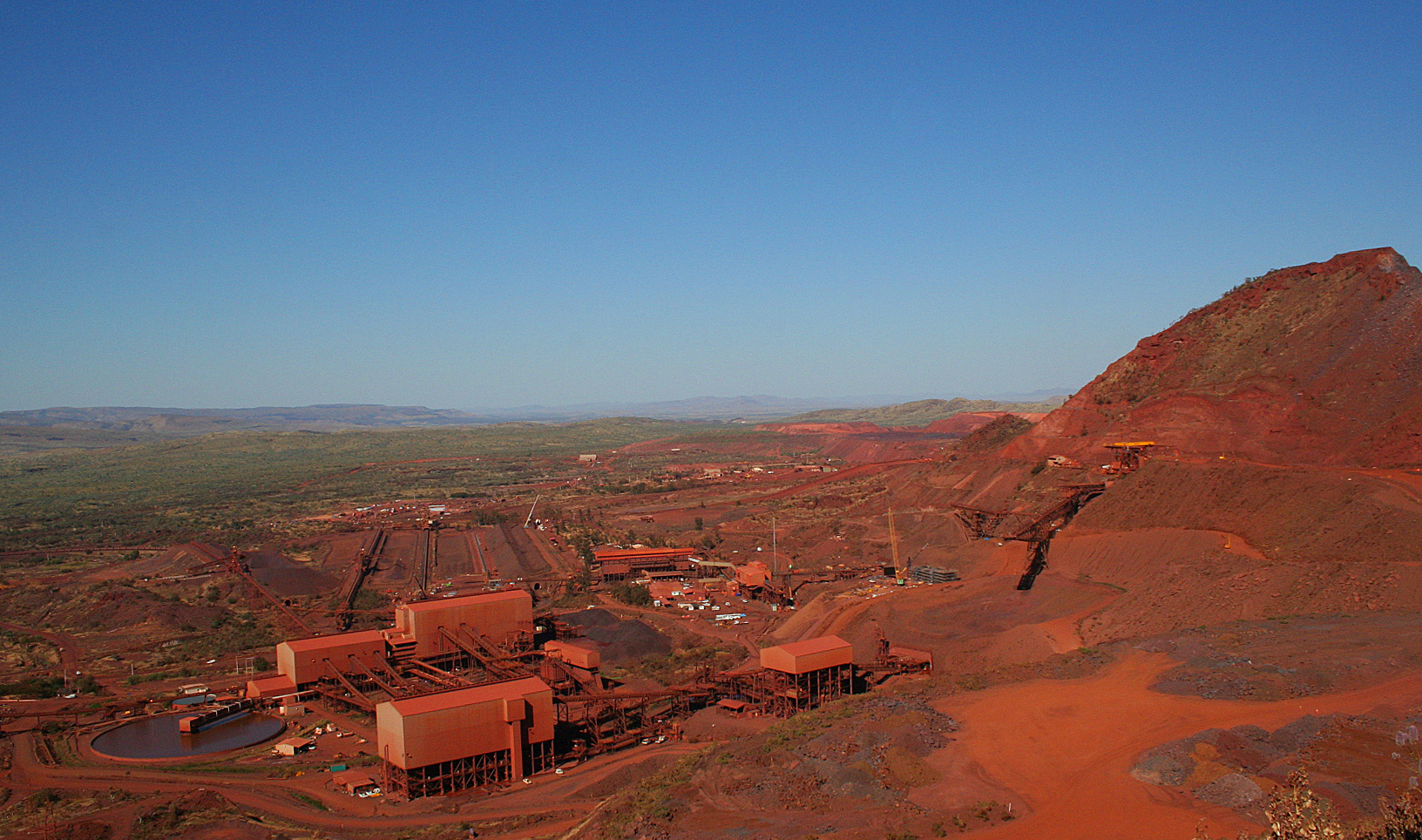
- The Mount Tom Price mine

- Location in Western Australia
- Interactive map of Mount Tom Price mine
- Location: Shire of Ashburton, Pilbara, Western Australia, Australia; 22°44′58″S 117°46′22″E
- Products: Iron ore
- Production: 28 million tonnes/annum
- Opened: 1966
- Company: Rio Tinto Iron Ore
- Website: Rio Tinto Iron Ore website

The Mount Tom Price mine is an iron ore mine located in the Pilbara region of Western Australia, near the town of Tom Price.

The mine is fully owned and operated by Rio Tinto Iron Ore and is one of twelve iron ore mines the company operates in the Pilbara. In 2009, the combined Pilbara operations produced 202 million tonnes of iron ore, a 15 percent increase from 2008. The Pilbara operations accounted for almost 13 percent of the world's 2009 iron ore production of 1.59 billion tonnes.

The Hamersley Range, where the mine is located, contains 80 percent of all identified iron ore reserves in Australia and is one of the world's major iron ore provinces.

== Overview ==
Iron ore mines in the Pilbara region

Rio Tinto's iron ore operations in the Pilbara began in 1966, with the Mount Tom Price mine opening that year. Mount Tom Price was the company's first mine to open in the Pilbara. The mine has an annual production capacity of 28 million tonnes of iron ore, sourced from open-pit operations. The ore is processed on site before being loaded onto rail. Ore from Mount Tom Price, like Brockman, Paraburdoo, Channar, Eastern Range, Marandoo and Yandicoogina are transported as lump and fines ore product from the mines to Dampier via rail. Before being loaded onto ships for export, the product is blended and rescreened. The maximum size for the lumps is 31.5 mm, while the fines are at a maximum of 6.3 mm.

Ore from the mine is then transported to the coast through the Hamersley & Robe River railway, where it is loaded onto ships.

The mine's workforce is residential and lives in Tom Price. In 2009, the mine employed 1,515 people, a decrease in comparison to 2008, when it employed 1,701.

The mine is owned by Hamersley Iron Pty Ltd, a fully owned subsidiary of Rio Tinto, which owns six mines in the Pilbara, including Mount Tom Price, and partly owns two more mines in the region. The company is building a 45MW/12MWh battery as a virtual synchronous machine to control the mine's electricity grid.
