= Marandoo mine =

Iron ore mine in Western Australia

- Location in Western Australia
- Interactive map of Marandoo mine
- Location: Shire of Ashburton, Pilbara, Western Australia, Australia; 22°38′25″S 118°07′15″E
- Products: Iron ore
- Production: 15 million t/a (33 billion lb/a)
- Opened: 1994
- Company: Rio Tinto

The Marandoo mine is an iron ore mine located in the Pilbara region of Western Australia, 45 kilometres east of Tom Price.

The mine is owned and operated by Rio Tinto and is one of seventeen iron ore mines the company operates in the Pilbara. In 2009, the combined Pilbara operations produced 202 million tonnes (450 billion pounds) of iron ore, a 15 percent increase from 2008. The Pilbara operations accounted for almost 13 percent of the world's 2009 iron ore production of 1.59 billion tonnes (3.5 trillion pounds).

The mine, alongside the rail, is within a narrow corridor that splits Karijini National Park into a northern and a southern half. The Hamersley Range, where the mine is located, contains 80 percent of all identified iron ore reserves in Australia and is one of the world's major iron ore provinces.

== Overview ==
Iron ore mines in the Pilbara region

Marandoo was formerly located in the Karijini National Park until it was excised in 1991 to allow for mining operations to commence. An associated rail corridor was excised allowing transport of the ore to the coast to the west, and to connect with future mines to the east.

Rio Tinto iron ore operations in the Pilbara began in 1966. The mine itself began operations in 1994. The mine has an annual production capacity of 15 million tonnes (33 billion pounds) of iron ore, sourced from open-pit operations. The ore is processed on site before being loaded onto rail.

Ore from the mine is then transported to the coast through the Hamersley & Robe River railway line, where it is loaded onto ships. Ore from Marandoo, like Brockman, Mount Tom Price, Paraburdoo, Channar, Eastern Range and Yandicoogina are transported as lump and fines ore product from the mines to Dampier via rail. Before being loaded onto ships for export, the product is blended and rescreened. The maximum size for the lumps is 31.5 millimetres (1.24 in), while the fines are at a maximum of 6.3 millimetres (0.25 in).

Marandoo opened in October 1994 and was, at the time, the showpiece mine in regards to best practice design for Hamerley Iron.

The mine is owned by Hamersley Iron Pty Ltd, a fully owned subsidiary of Rio Tinto, which owns 13 mines in the Pilbara, including Marandoo.

The mines lifetime was extended another 20 years in the early 2010s when its lease was modified to allow it to extended below the natural water table. Groundwater is currently pumped to plains outside Karijini, where Rio Tinto is growing hay and supporting cattle.

=== Workers ===
The mine's workforce is on a fly-in fly-out roster, having originally been based residential, until the town became too small for the workforce. In 2009, the mine employed 355 people, an increase in comparison to 2008, when it only employed 250.

=== Tourism ===
The mine can be seen from Mount Bruce, the second-highest mountain in Western Australia, located within Karijini National Park and the Hamersley Range.
