= Paraburdoo, Western Australia =

Paraburdoo
- Town
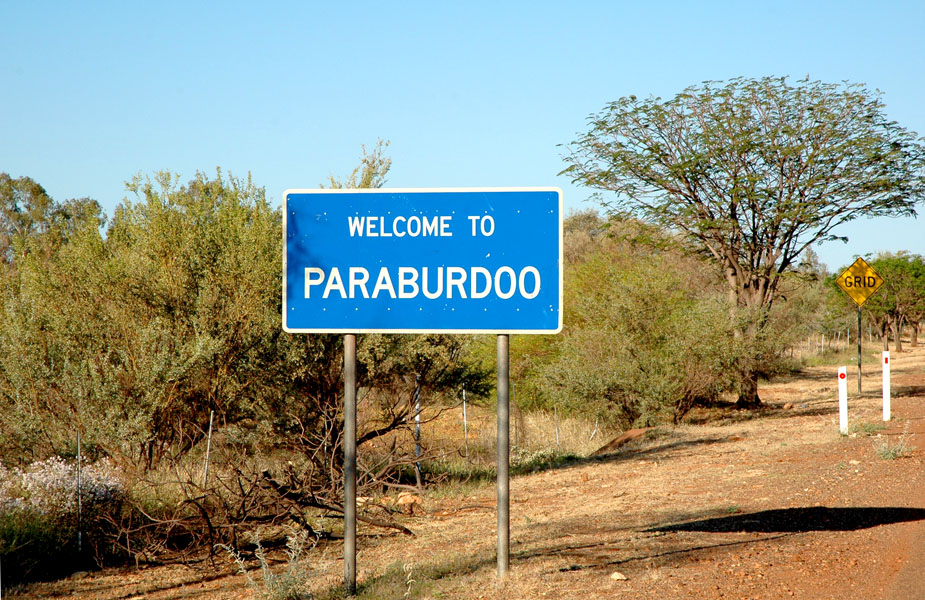

- Interactive map of Paraburdoo
- Coordinates: 23°12′03″S 117°40′18″E
- Country: Australia
- State: Western Australia
- LGA: Shire of Ashburton
- Location: 79 km (49 mi) from Tom Price; 426 km (265 mi) from Karratha; 336 km (209 mi) from Newman

Government
  - State electorate: Pilbara
  - Federal division: Durack

Area
  - Total: 153.1 km^{2} (59.1 sq mi)
- Elevation: 424 m (1,391 ft)

Population
  - Total: 1,319 (UCL 2021)
- Postcode: 6754
- Mean max temp: 33.7 °C (92.7 °F)
- Mean min temp: 18.3 °C (64.9 °F)
- Annual rainfall: 317.8 mm (12.51 in)

Paraburdoo (/ˌpærəbəˈduː/) is a mining town in the Pilbara region of Western Australia. The region is served by Paraburdoo Airport, which is situated 9 kilometres (5.6 mi) from the town.

== Etymology ==
The name of the town comes from an Aboriginal word that apparently means "feathered meat", which could refer to the abundant little corella or flock pigeons. It could also mean Rock Cave (para means rock and buradoo means hole or cave) to refer to caves nearby.

== Economy ==
Paraburdoo was developed in the early 1970s to support Hamersley Iron's (now Pilbara Iron) local iron ore mining operations, and was gazetted as a town in 1972.

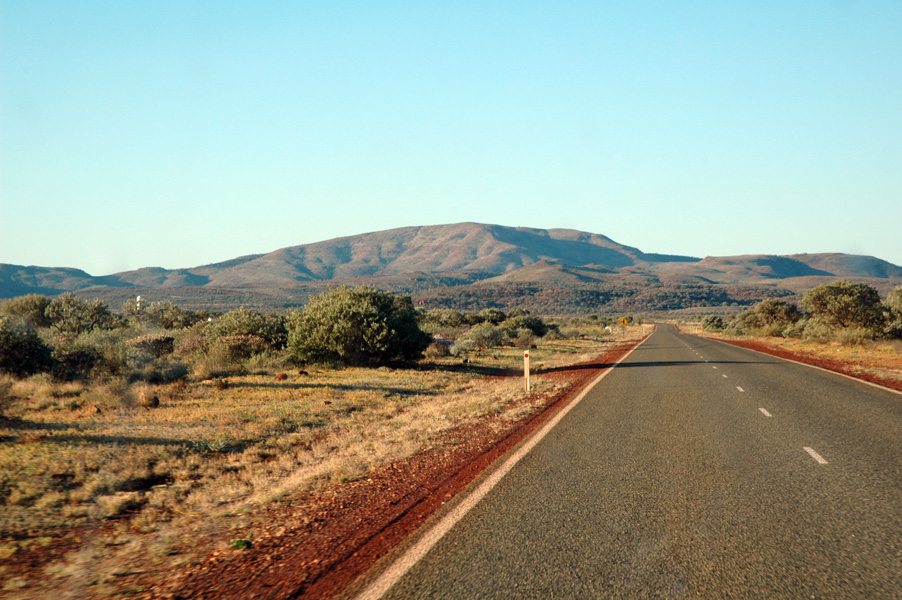
Highway just outside the town of Paraburdoo showing the high iron oxide concentrations in the soil

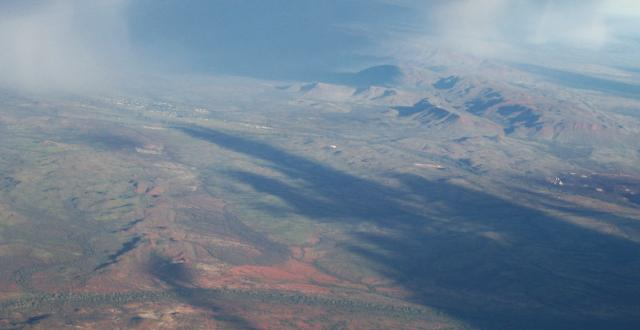
Paraburdoo from the air

The town provides housing to workers of the three nearby Rio Tinto mines, those being the Channar, Eastern Range, Paraburdoo mine and also Western Range which recently opened in 2024.

== Geography ==
Paraburdoo is located 1,528 kilometres (949 mi) north of Perth, 24 kilometres (15 mi) north of the Tropic of Capricorn, nearly 300 kilometres (190 mi) from the coast, and 424 metres (1,391 ft) above sea level.

== Facilities ==
Most of the town's residents are employed by Pilbara Iron's mining operation and the supporting services. Facilities available for families include daycare, a primary school, and a TAFE. The nearest high school is Tom Price Senior High School in Tom Price, 81 kilometres (50 mi) away. There are also skate parks, swimming pools, tennis courts, and netball, cricket and football fields. Paraburdoo has its own shopping facilities and medical centres.

== Climate ==
Paraburdoo has a hot desert climate (Köppen climate classification BWh). In summer, the days are very hot and the nights are warm. The mean annual maximum temperature is 46.0 °C (114.8 °F), and the all-time record high is 48.1 °C (118.6 °F), on 21 January 2024. There is an average of 72.2 days per year where the temperature rises above 40.0 °C (104.0 °F). In winter, the days are warm and the nights are cool. Precipitation is highly variable, coming from storms and tropical cyclones. It falls most often between December and March. Some years, summer months can see no rainfall, and other years over 200 millimetres (7.9 in) of rainfall can come in a single month. Rainfall is sparse from July to November. The annual average rainfall is 317.8 millimetres (12.5 in) which would make it a semi-arid climate except that its high evapotranspiration, or its aridity, makes it a desert climate.

Climate data for Paraburdoo
Month	Jan	Feb	Mar	Apr	May	Jun	Jul	Aug	Sep	Oct	Nov	Dec	Year
Record high °C (°F)	48.1 (118.6)	47.8 (118.0)	45.7 (114.3)	41.6 (106.9)	37.0 (98.6)	32.8 (91.0)	32.8 (91.0)	36.7 (98.1)	40.2 (104.4)	44.7 (112.5)	44.7 (112.5)	47.8 (118.0)	48.1 (118.6)
Mean daily maximum °C (°F)	40.8 (105.4)	39.3 (102.7)	37.1 (98.8)	33.8 (92.8)	29.1 (84.4)	25.1 (77.2)	25.1 (77.2)	27.8 (82.0)	31.5 (88.7)	36.1 (97.0)	38.4 (101.1)	40.7 (105.3)	33.7 (92.7)
Mean daily minimum °C (°F)	26.1 (79.0)	25.4 (77.7)	23.7 (74.7)	19.9 (67.8)	14.8 (58.6)	11.4 (52.5)	9.9 (49.8)	11.1 (52.0)	14.0 (57.2)	18.4 (65.1)	21.6 (70.9)	24.8 (76.6)	18.4 (65.1)
Record low °C (°F)	16.2 (61.2)	17.9 (64.2)	11.7 (53.1)	10.5 (50.9)	5.3 (41.5)	2.4 (36.3)	1.3 (34.3)	2.0 (35.6)	4.4 (39.9)	8.2 (46.8)	13.1 (55.6)	16.4 (61.5)	1.3 (34.3)
Average rainfall mm (inches)	58.3 (2.30)	73.9 (2.91)	50.9 (2.00)	23.5 (0.93)	18.8 (0.74)	22.9 (0.90)	12.6 (0.50)	9.6 (0.38)	4.2 (0.17)	3.9 (0.15)	8.7 (0.34)	26.7 (1.05)	315.4 (12.42)
Average precipitation days	7.4	7.9	6.2	3.9	2.9	3.7	2.4	1.8	1.0	1.2	2.2	4.4	45.0
Average afternoon relative humidity (%) (at 15:00)	19	29	25	26	23	27	26	20	15	12	11	16	21
Source: Bureau of Meteorology; Temperatures: 1996–2024; Rain data: 1974–2024; Relative humidity: 1996–2010

== See also ==
- Pilbara historical timeline
- Pilbara newspapers
- Red Dog Story
