= Channar mine =

Iron ore mine in Western Australia

- Location in Western Australia
- Interactive map of Channar mine
- Location: Pilbara, Western Australia, Australia; 23°18′48″S 117°47′06″E
- Products: Iron ore
- Production: 20 million tonnes/annum
- Opened: 1990
- Company: Rio Tinto Iron Ore (60%) Sinosteel Corporation (40%)
- Website: Rio Tinto Iron Ore website

The Channar mine is an iron ore mine located in the Pilbara region of Western Australia, 17 kilometres south-east of Paraburdoo.

The mine is partly owned and operated by Rio Tinto Iron Ore and is one of fifteen iron ore mines the company operates in the Pilbara. In 2009, the combined Pilbara operations produced 202 million tonnes of iron ore, a 15 percent increase from 2008. The Pilbara operations accounted for almost 13 percent of the world's 2009 iron ore production of 1.59 billion tonnes.

The Hamersley Range, where the mine is located, contains 80 percent of all identified iron ore reserves in Australia and is one of the world's major iron ore provinces.

== Overview ==
Iron ore mines in the Pilbara region

Rio Tinto iron ore operations in the Pilbara began in 1966. The mine itself began open-pit operations in January 1990. The combined production capacity of the Paraburdoo, Eastern Range and Channar mines is 20 million tonnes of iron ore. The ore is processed both at Channar and at Paraburdoo before being loaded onto rail, being transported from Channar to Paraburdoo by conveyor belt. Ore from the mine is then transported to the coast through the Hamersley & Robe River railway, where it is loaded onto ships. Ore from Channar, like that from Brockman, Mount Tom Price, Paraburdoo, Eastern Range, Marandoo and Yandicoogina, is transported as lump and fines ore product from the mines to Dampier via rail. Before being loaded onto ships for export, the product is blended and rescreened. The maximum size for the lumps is 31.5 mm, while the fines are at a maximum of 6.3 mm.

The mines has a residential workforce in Paraburdoo. In 2009, the combined operations of Paraburdoo, Channar and Eastern Range employed 1,081 people, a decrease in comparison to 2008, when it employed 1,324.

The mine was closed for a time in late 2008, after joint venture partner Sinosteel failed to honor the benchmark contract price for ore from the Channar mine during the Great Recession. According to Credit Suisse, at the time, ore from Channar was costing the company 11% more than the equivalent product from Brazil.

The mine, which reached its full design capacity of 10 million tonnes per year by 1998, is scheduled to provide 200 million tonnes of iron ore to the Chinese steel industry throughout its life. The Channar mine was the first mineral resources project a Chinese company got involved in outside of China, and was the biggest overall overseas investment at the time. In 2010, Rio Tinto and Sinosteel announced plans to expand production by a further 50Mt/year.

The mine is jointly owned by Rio Tinto, which holds 60 percent, and Chinese company Sinosteel Corporation, which owns the remaining 40 percent. Rio Tinto's share of the mine is owned through Hamersley Iron Pty Ltd, a fully owned subsidiary, which owns six mines in the Pilbara, and partly owns two more in the region, including Channar.
