= Karijini National Park =

National park in Western Australia

- IUCN category II (national park)
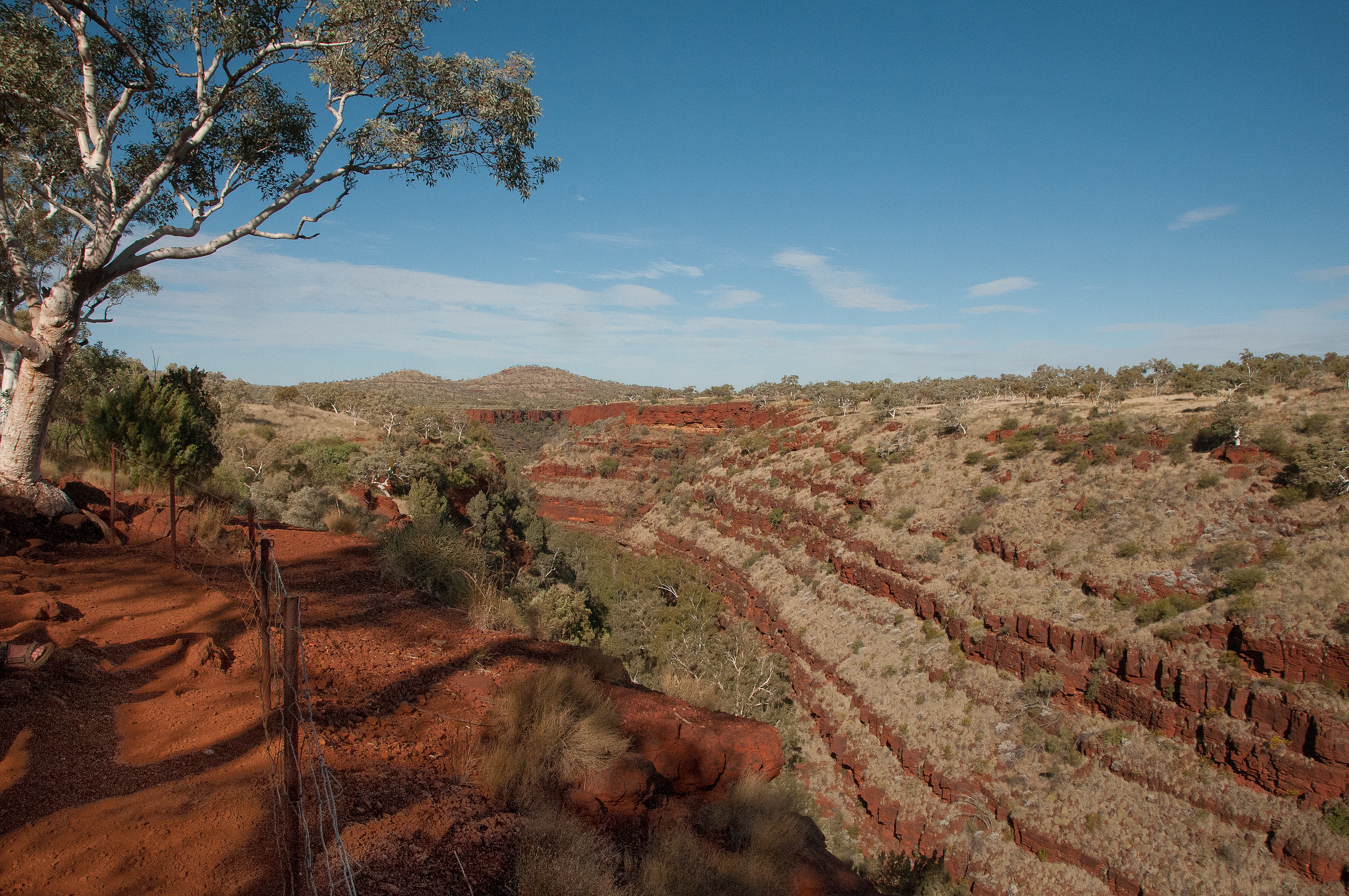
- Dales Gorge

- Location within Western Australia
- Location: Western Australia
- Nearest city: Tom Price
- Coordinates: 22°29′46″S 118°23′50″E
- Area: 6,274.22 km^{2} (2,422.49 sq mi)
- Established: 1969
- Visitors: 166000 (in 2009)
- Governing body: Department of Parks and Wildlife (Western Australia)
- Website: Official website

Karijini National Park is an Australian national park centred in the Hamersley Ranges of the Pilbara region in the northwestern section of Western Australia. The park is located north of the Tropic of Capricorn, 1,055 kilometres (656 mi) from the state's capital city, Perth. Formerly known as Hamersley Range National Park, the park was officially renamed in 1991.

At 627,422 hectares (1,550,390 acres), Karijini is the second largest national park in Western Australia (behind Karlamilyi National Park), with rock formations that are estimated at 2.5 billion years old. The ideal time to visit Karijini National Park is between May and September, during Australia's late autumn, winter and early spring. The days are warm but the nights are cold. Summer temperatures which regularly reach in excess of 38 °C (100 °F) make it less practical to visit, with added risk of bushfires.

The park is physically split into a northern and a southern half by a corridor containing the Hamersley and Robe River railway and the Marandoo iron ore mine. Tourist attractions such as gorges and waterfalls are located in the northern half of the park, accessible via sealed and gravel roads. There are no sealed access roads in the southern half.

The park is served by the Paraburdoo Airport (PBO) located 100 kilometres (62 mi) from Karijini National Park and Newman Airport (ZNE) is 263 kilometres (163 mi) from Karijini National Park. Hire cars are available from both airports. Solomon Airport, located 15 kilometres (9.3 mi) to the west services some of the nearby iron ore mines.

== History ==
The park is the traditional home of the Banyjima, Kurrama and Innawonga Aboriginal people. The Banyjima name for the Hamersley Range is Karijini, meaning 'hilly place'. Evidence of their early occupation dates back more than 20,000 years. During that period, Aboriginal land management practices, such as fire-stick farming, resulted in a diversity of vegetation types and stages of succession that helped determine the nature of the plants and animals found in the park today.

A party led by explorer Francis Thomas Gregory explored the area in 1861. He named the Hamersley Range, on which the park is centred, after his friend Edward Hamersley.

== Climate ==
The park is located in the Pilbara region, and is mostly tropical semi-arid climate. In summer, thunderstorms and cyclones are common, bringing 250–350 millimetres (9.8–13.8 in) of rain annually. Temperatures on summer days frequently exceed 40 °C (104 °F), while winter nights can bring frost.

== Geology ==
Several gorges that flow north out of the park—including Dales, Kalamina, Wittenoom and Yampire Gorges—provide notable displays of the rock layers:

- Banded iron formation – Brockman iron formation
- Dolomite – Wittenoom dolomite
- Shale – Mount McRae Shale

== Fauna ==
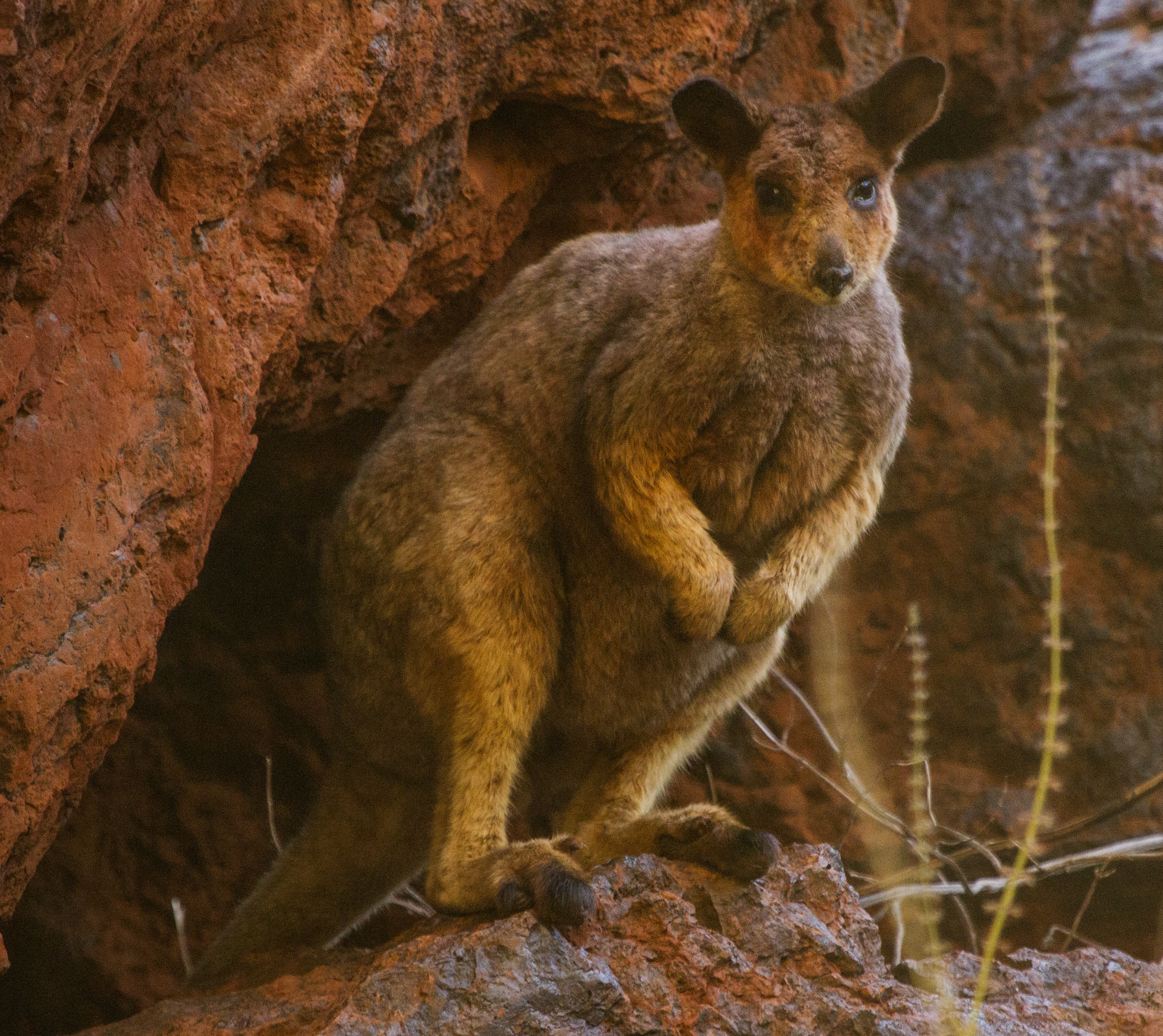
Rock-wallaby

The park's wildlife includes red kangaroos, euros, rock-wallabies, dingos, echidnas, geckos, goannas, bats, legless lizards and a large variety of birds and snakes, including pythons.

== Features ==
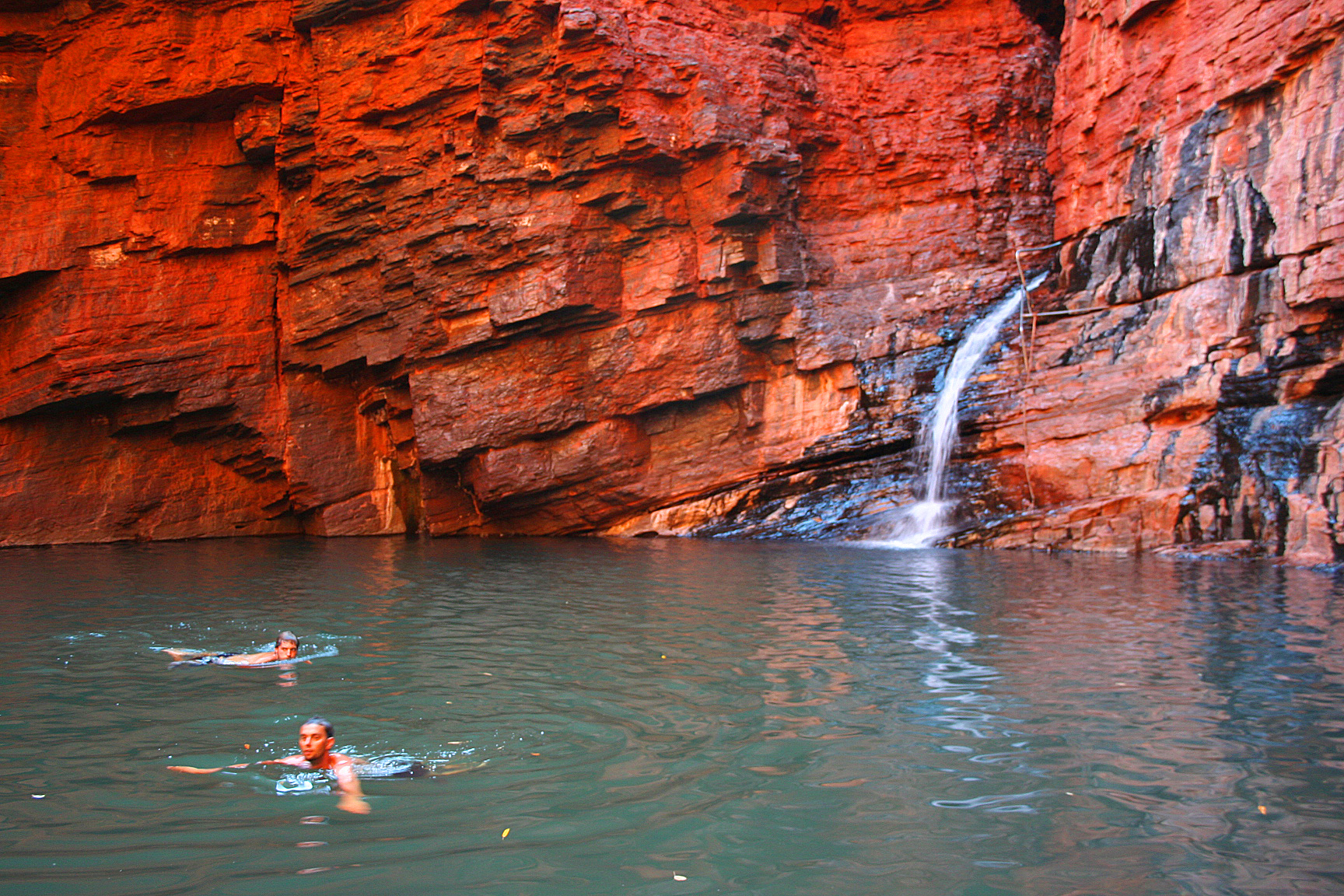
Handrail Pool in Weano Gorge

The park is most notable for its many gorges containing slot canyons, waterfalls and water holes with visitors sometimes swimming in the cold pools of water.

Hamersley Gorge is located in the northwestern region of the park, while Range Gorge is in the north, Munjina Gorge is in the east, and Hancock, Joffre, Knox, Red and Weano Gorges converge in the park's centre.

While the park is fully open to the public, visitors are warned to exercise due caution when walking in and around the vicinity of Yampire and Wittenoom Gorges near the northern boundary of the park due to the presence of blue asbestos—a known cancer-causing agent when inhaled—which occurs in a number of the rock formations.

== See also ==
- List of protected areas of Western Australia
