= Tom Price, Western Australia =

Tom Price
- Town
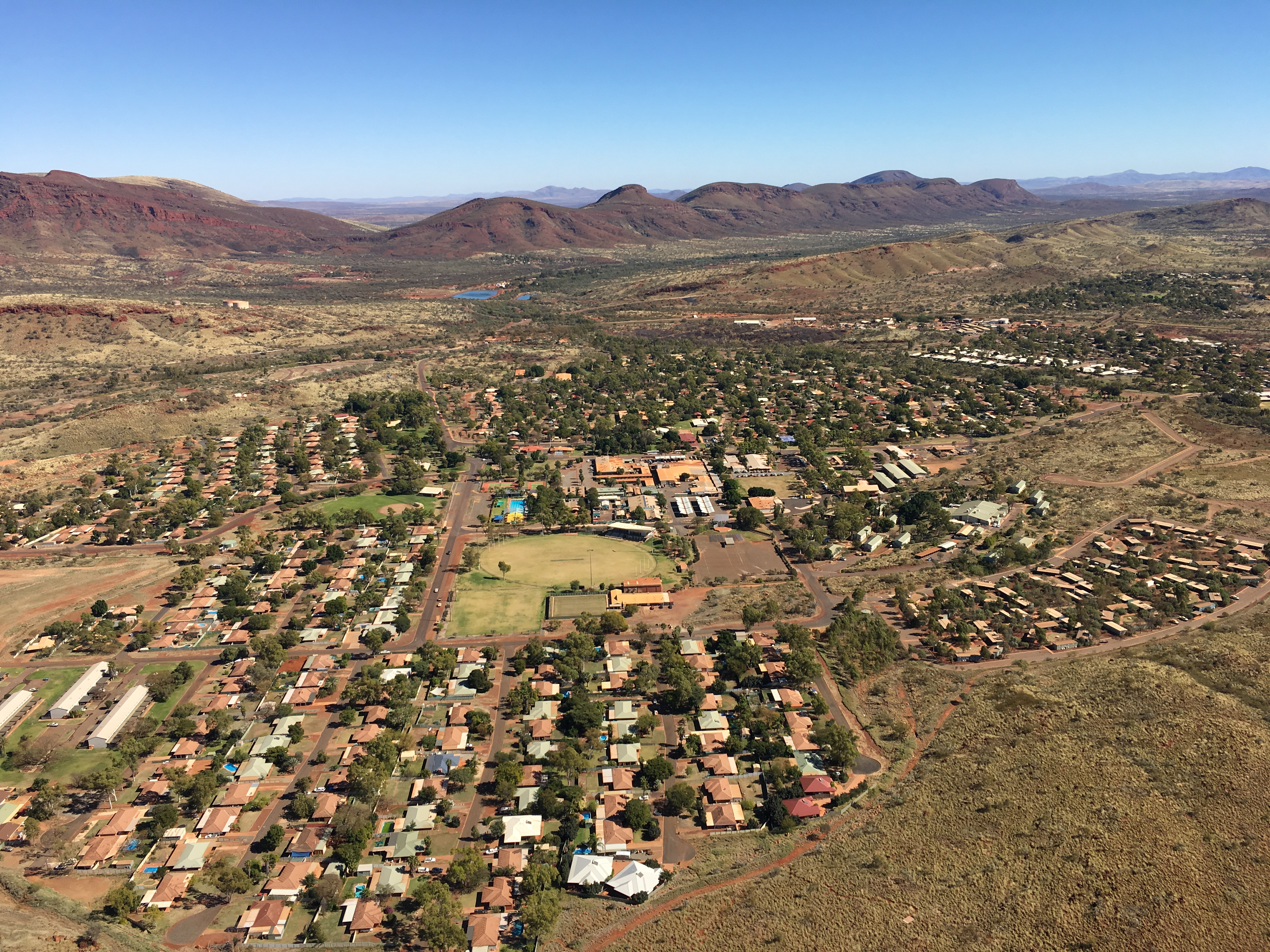
- Aerial view of Tom Price

- Interactive map of Tom Price
- Coordinates: 22°41′38″S 117°47′42″E
- Country: Australia
- State: Western Australia
- LGA: Shire of Ashburton
- Location: 1,470 km (910 mi) from Perth; 344 km (214 mi) from Karratha; 277 km (172 mi) from Newman
- Established: 1960s

Government
  - State electorate: Pilbara
  - Federal division: Durack

Area
  - Total: 73.8 km^{2} (28.5 sq mi)
- Elevation: 747 m (2,451 ft)

Population
  - Total: 2,874 (UCL 2021)
- Postcode: 6751
- Mean max temp: 31.3 °C (88.3 °F)
- Mean min temp: 15.6 °C (60.1 °F)
- Annual rainfall: 404.8 mm (15.94 in)

Tom Price is a mining town in the Pilbara region of Western Australia. It is located inland, at the edge of the Hamersley Range. Tom Price is the highest town above sea level (747 m [2,451 ft]) in Western Australia, and is consequently dubbed "Top Town in WA".

== Overview ==
Primarily an iron ore mining town, the Mount Tom Price mine (situated approximately 5 km [3.1 mi] out of town) is under the control of mining giant Rio Tinto. Due to the mid-2000s and late-2010s resource booms in Western Australia, Tom Price is one of the more affluent non-metropolitan regions in Australia, with the average Rio Tinto employee's wage being significantly higher than the Australian average. Tom Price had a population of 3,005 at the 2016 census, and its median age of 31 reflected Tom Price's relatively young family-oriented community.

== Climate ==
Tom Price is the closest town to Karijini National Park and is serviced by the nearby Paraburdoo Airport. Due to its elevation (747 m [2,451 ft]), temperatures are lowered and rainfall is intensified, resulting in the town possessing a subtropical semi-arid climate (Köppen: BSh). Summers are very hot with highly variable rainfall, while winters are mild and dry. Average maxima vary from 38.2 °C (100.8 °F) in January to 23.0 °C (73.4 °F) in July, while average minima fluctuate between 23.0 °C (73.4 °F) in January and 7.2 °C (45.0 °F) in July. Annual precipitation is rather low (averaging 404.8 mm [15.94 in]), and is spread across 36.8 precipitation days (over 1.0 mm [0.039 in]). Extreme temperatures have ranged from 45.0 °C (113.0 °F) on 27 December to −1.0 °C (30.2 °F) on 14 July 2002.

Climate data for Tom Price (22.70°S 117.77°E, 746 m AMSL) (1997–2011 normals & extremes, rainfall to 1972)
Month	Jan	Feb	Mar	Apr	May	Jun	Jul	Aug	Sep	Oct	Nov	Dec	Year
Record high °C (°F)	44.6 (112.3)	44.6 (112.3)	40.5 (104.9)	38.2 (100.8)	34.1 (93.4)	31.2 (88.2)	29.9 (85.8)	32.5 (90.5)	38.0 (100.4)	41.5 (106.7)	41.5 (106.7)	45.0 (113.0)	45.0 (113.0)
Mean daily maximum °C (°F)	38.2 (100.8)	35.9 (96.6)	34.2 (93.6)	31.6 (88.9)	27.6 (81.7)	23.5 (74.3)	23.0 (73.4)	25.5 (77.9)	29.0 (84.2)	33.5 (92.3)	35.6 (96.1)	37.6 (99.7)	31.3 (88.3)
Mean daily minimum °C (°F)	23.0 (73.4)	22.4 (72.3)	20.6 (69.1)	17.4 (63.3)	12.0 (53.6)	8.0 (46.4)	7.2 (45.0)	8.5 (47.3)	11.4 (52.5)	15.9 (60.6)	19.0 (66.2)	21.7 (71.1)	15.6 (60.1)
Record low °C (°F)	14.2 (57.6)	17.0 (62.6)	12.1 (53.8)	8.8 (47.8)	4.1 (39.4)	0.0 (32.0)	−1.0 (30.2)	2.0 (35.6)	3.9 (39.0)	6.6 (43.9)	10.2 (50.4)	13.0 (55.4)	−1.0 (30.2)
Average precipitation mm (inches)	82.3 (3.24)	95.5 (3.76)	60.4 (2.38)	30.9 (1.22)	20.4 (0.80)	25.3 (1.00)	16.8 (0.66)	10.8 (0.43)	2.4 (0.09)	4.4 (0.17)	10.9 (0.43)	40.7 (1.60)	404.8 (15.94)
Average precipitation days (≥ 1.0 mm)	6.8	7.6	5.2	2.9	2.4	2.5	1.8	1.1	0.5	0.6	1.6	3.8	36.8
Average afternoon relative humidity (%)	25	34	32	29	28	32	31	24	20	17	16	20	26
Average dew point °C (°F)	10.6 (51.1)	13.0 (55.4)	11.8 (53.2)	8.6 (47.5)	4.7 (40.5)	3.2 (37.8)	1.9 (35.4)	1.0 (33.8)	1.5 (34.7)	2.0 (35.6)	3.9 (39.0)	7.7 (45.9)	5.8 (42.5)
Source: Bureau of Meteorology (1997–2011 normals & extremes, rainfall to 1972)

== Etymology ==
Tom Price (the town, the mine and the mountain) were named after Thomas Moore Price (1891–1962), the vice-president of the giant United States steel company Kaiser Steel. Price was one of the main initiators and supporters of the opening up of the Pilbara region to iron ore mining, a long-time associate of Henry J. Kaiser and active in the exploration and development of the Hamersley Range.

Thomas Moore Price, born 14 January 1891, in Madison, North Carolina, died in September 1962, two hours after learning of the discovery of the deposits at what later was called Mt. Tom Price.

== Recreational activities ==
Tom Price is a very sports-oriented community, partly due to the young population and the lack of other facilities within the town. Tom Price has a range of recreational activities including motocross, speedway, BMX, and many sporting facilities including an Olympic-sized pool, well-equipped gym, tennis, squash, netball, volleyball, golf and basketball courts and three ovals used for football, softball and soccer.

The Fortescue National Football League organises Australian rules football in Tom Price and the nearby town of Paraburdoo.

The town also boasts an unusually high number of artists. Artists in Tom Price often focus on painting and photography, such works often focus on landscapes or linked with Aboriginal heritage.

== Attractions ==
Being situated in the Pilbara, Tom Price is in a close proximity to many popular attractions, including Karijini National Park, Millstream, Wittenoom and Mount Nameless/Jarndunmunha.

Tourist season usually goes from May through to October. This is due to the heat of the Australian summer, and the irregular cyclones from October to April.

== Schools ==
- North Tom Price Primary School
- Tom Price Primary School
- Tom Price Senior High School

Due to its isolation and small population many parents choose to send their children away to boarding schools to further their secondary education, particularly university-bound students, as Tom Price Senior High lacks the student numbers to fulfil the required class numbers set by the Department of Education and Training for many ATAR (Australian Tertiary Admission Rank) subjects. Some ATAR subjects are available through distance education.

Many students further their studies in areas linked to the mines such as through automotive and trade subjects, often linking into apprenticeships.

== Gallery ==
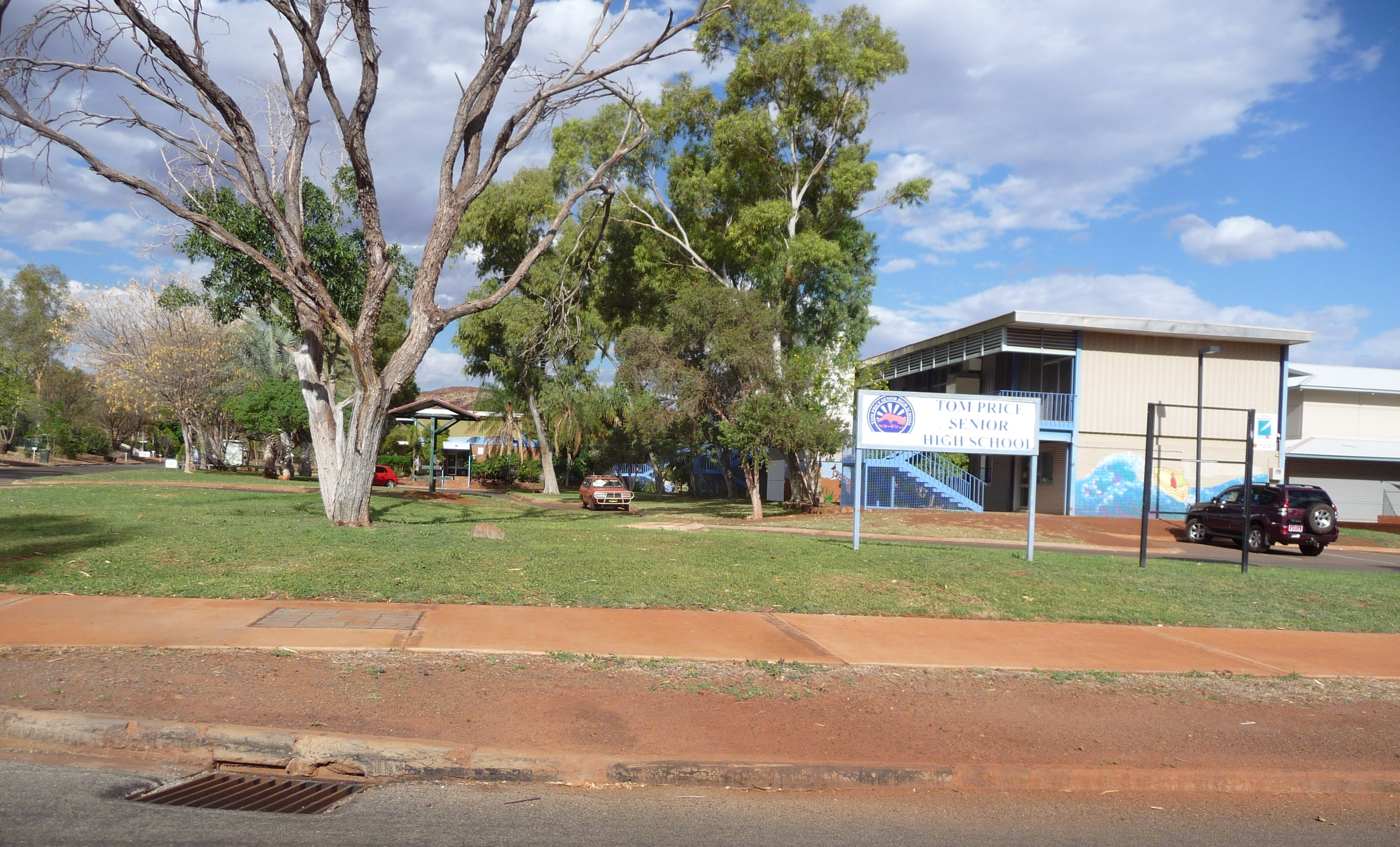
Tom Price Senior High School

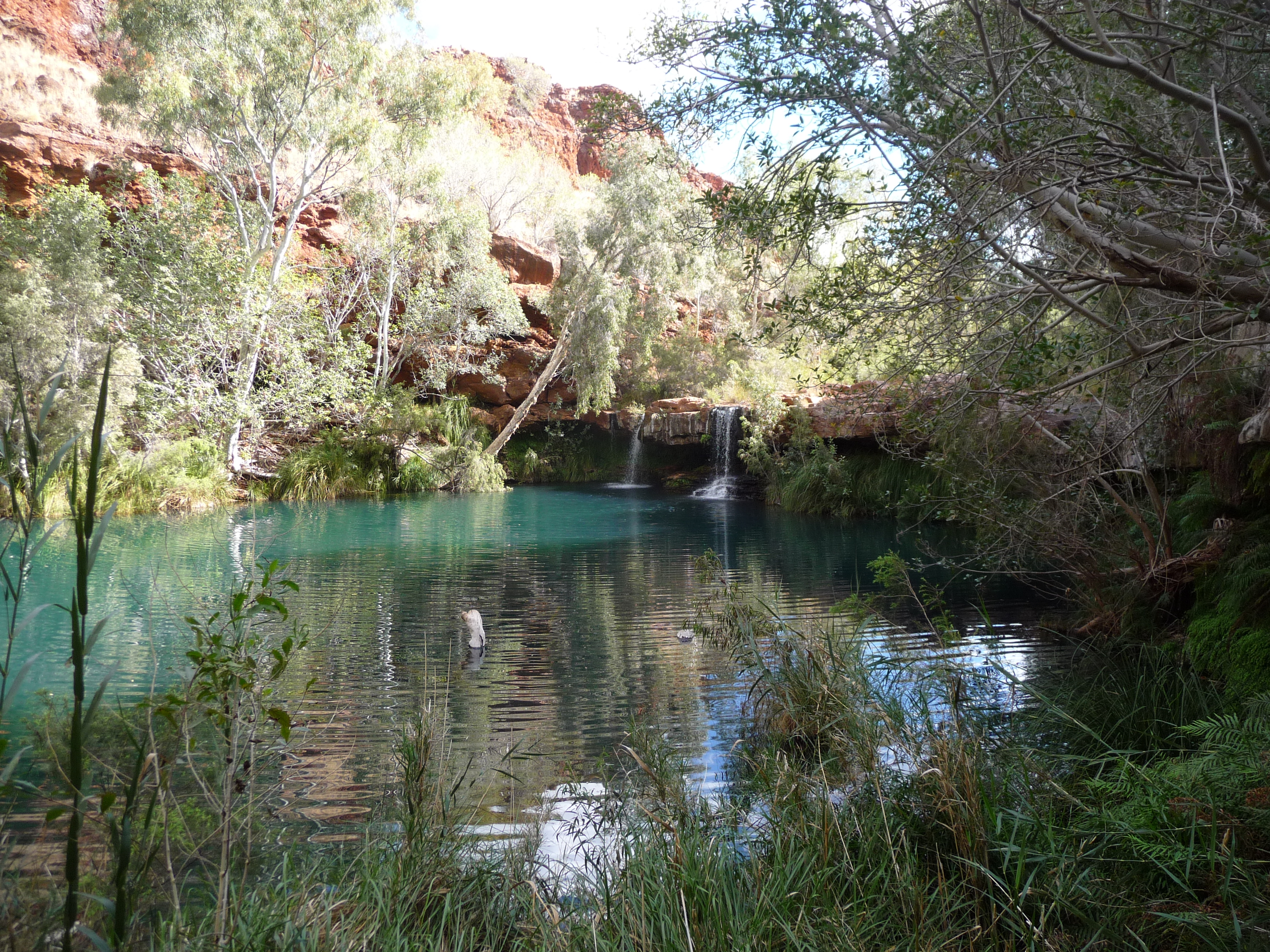
Fern Pool in Karijini National Park is a popular destination for tourists.

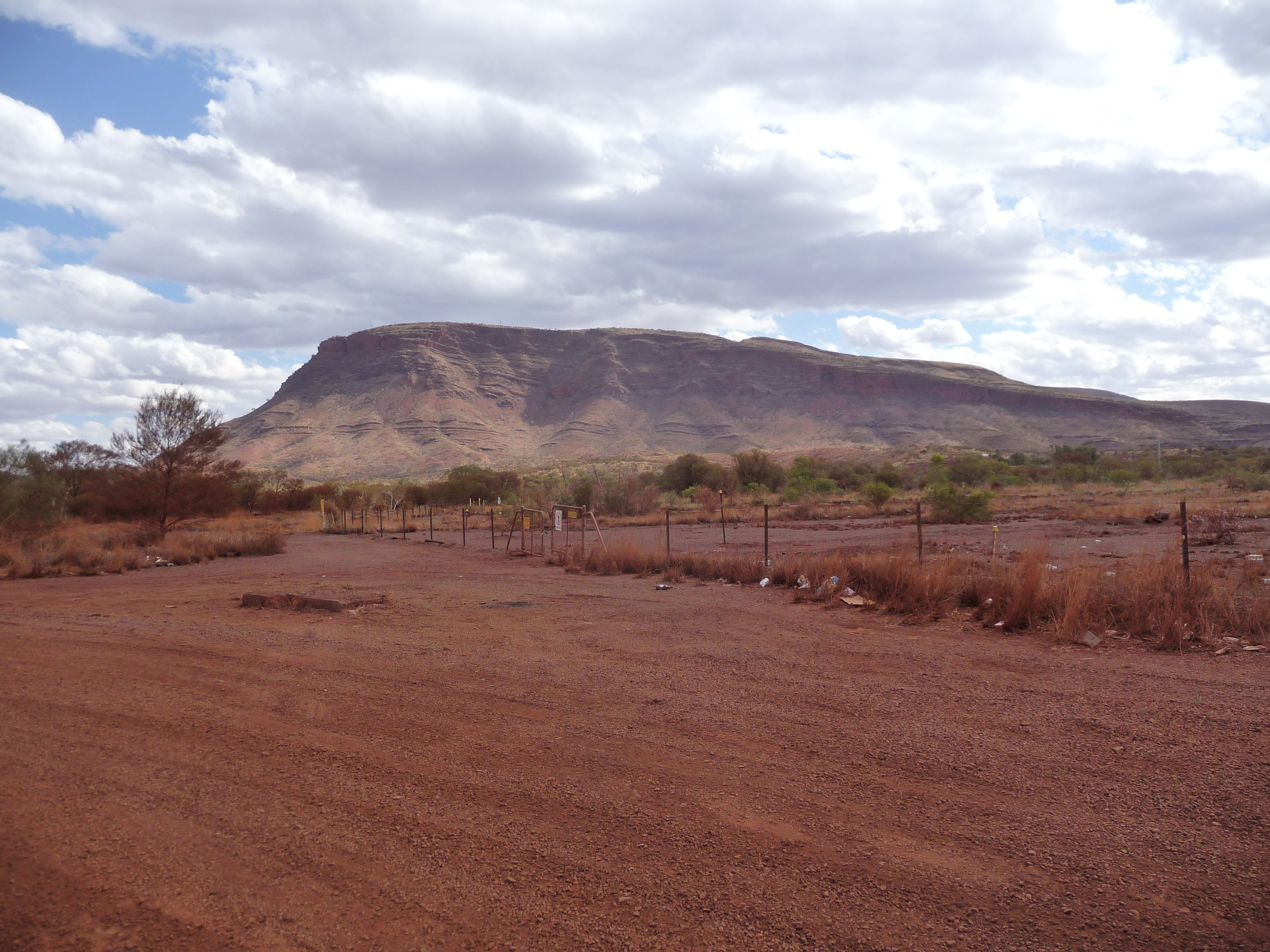
Jarndunmunha (Mount Nameless), the second-highest peak in Western Australia with vehicle access (after Mount Meharry), is located in Tom Price.

== See also ==
- Red Dog (Pilbara)
