= Shire of Ashburton =

Coordinates: 22°41′38″S 117°47′42″E

- Local government area
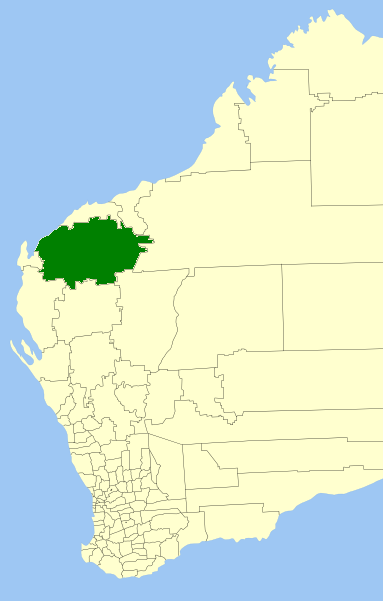
- Location in Western Australia

- Interactive map of Shire of Ashburton
- Country: Australia
- State: Western Australia
- Region: Pilbara
- Established: 1972
- Council seat: Tom Price

Government
  - Shire President: Kerry White
  - State electorate: North West Central
  - Federal division: Durack

Area
  - Total: 105,647 km^{2} (40,791 sq mi)

Population
  - Total: 7,391 (LGA 2021)
- Website: Shire of Ashburton
LGAs around Shire of Ashburton
Indian Ocean	Karratha	Port Hedland
Exmouth	Shire of Ashburton	East Pilbara
Carnarvon	Upper Gascoyne	Meekatharra

The Shire of Ashburton is one of the four local government areas in the Pilbara region of Western Australia, covering an area of 105,647 square kilometres (40,791 sq mi). It is named after the Ashburton River.

The shire's administration centre is in the town of Tom Price. It had a population of about 13,000 as at the 2016 census, most of whom live in the mining towns or in nearby mining camps. Most of the land is taken up by pastoral leases or protected areas (including the Karijini National Park). Other than agriculture, industries important to Ashburton include mining, oil, natural gas, fishing, and tourism.

== History ==
It was established on 27 May 1972 as the Shire of West Pilbara, formed by the amalgamation of the original Shire of Ashburton and the Shire of Tableland. The new shire was described at the time as "the largest workable shire in Australia". It was originally based at Onslow, with a second office at Wittenoom.

It originally had nine members divided into six wards, but by 1977 had one councillor for each of the five towns in the shire (Onslow, Pannawonica, Paraburdoo, Tom Price, Wittenoom) and four members for the rural areas of the shire.

It was renamed the Shire of Ashburton on 18 December 1987. The name was changed to provide more identity to the particular region and to discriminate from the Newman region, which is also referred to as the "West Pilbara".

It was decided to move the administration office from Onslow to the more centrally located town of Tom Price in January 1990, when the Shire's administration office was officially opened in Poinciana Street.

== Wards ==
The shire is divided into six wards, nine councillors in total.

- Tom Price (3 councillors)
- Paraburdoo (2 councillors)
- Ashburton (1 councillor)
- Onslow (1 councillor)
- Pannawonica (1 councillor)
- Tableland (1 councillor)

== Towns and localities ==
The towns and localities of the Shire of Ashburton with population and size figures based on the most recent Australian census:

Locality	Population	Area	Map
Barrow Island	45 (SAL 2021)	259.1 km^{2} (100.0 sq mi)	
Cane	5 (SAL 2021)	3,458.8 km^{2} (1,335.5 sq mi)	
Chichester	41 (SAL 2021)	6,486.1 km^{2} (2,504.3 sq mi)	
Fortescue	190 (SAL 2021)	9,340.7 km^{2} (3,606.5 sq mi)	
Hamersley Range	197 (SAL 2021)	7,312.6 km^{2} (2,823.4 sq mi)	
Innawanga	4 (SAL 2021)	15,223.4 km^{2} (5,877.8 sq mi)	
Juna Downs	4 (SAL 2021)	2,143 km^{2} (827 sq mi)	
Karijini National Park		6,244.28 km^{2} (2,410.93 sq mi)	
Millstream	5 (SAL 2021)	2,795.1 km^{2} (1,079.2 sq mi)	
Mount Sheila	794 (SAL 2021)	5,074.7 km^{2} (1,959.4 sq mi)	
Mulga Downs	23 (SAL 2021)	3,453.6 km^{2} (1,333.4 sq mi)	
Nanutarra	37 (SAL 2021)	14,060.1 km^{2} (5,428.6 sq mi)	
Onslow	829 (SAL 2021)	185.2 km^{2} (71.5 sq mi)	
Pannawonica	685 (SAL 2021)	27.6 km^{2} (10.7 sq mi)	
Paraburdoo	1,324 (SAL 2021)	153.1 km^{2} (59.1 sq mi)	
Peedamulla	15 (SAL 2021)	2,487.9 km^{2} (960.6 sq mi)	
Rocklea	150 (SAL 2021)	6,132.6 km^{2} (2,367.8 sq mi)	
Talandji	82 (SAL 2021)	5,705.7 km^{2} (2,203.0 sq mi)	
Tom Price	2,910 (SAL 2021)	73.8 km^{2} (28.5 sq mi)	
Wittenoom	0 (SAL 2021)	353.1 km^{2} (136.3 sq mi)	
Yannarie	15 (SAL 2021)	9,990.5 km^{2} (3,857.4 sq mi)	

== Heritage-listed places ==
As of 2023, 84 places are heritage-listed in the Shire of Ashburton, of which six are on the State Register of Heritage Places, among them Nanutarra Station and Peedamulla Homestead.
