= Hamersley Range =

Mountain range in Western Australia

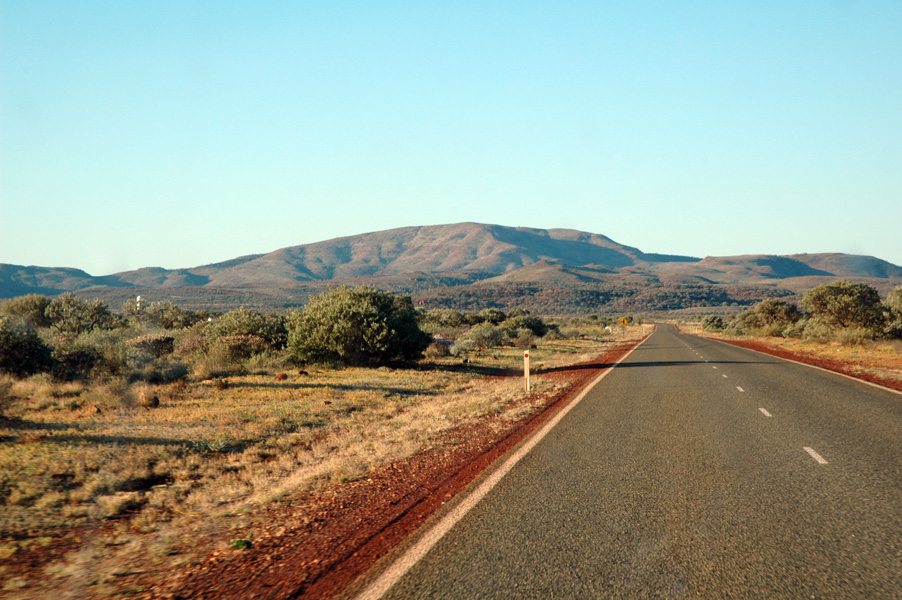
- Outside the town of Paraburdoo, showing part of the Hamersley Range in the background

Highest point
- Peak: Mount Meharry
- Elevation: 1,249 m (4,098 ft)
- Coordinates: 22°58′S 118°35′E

Geography
- Location within Western Australia
- Country: Australia
- State: Western Australia
- Region: Pilbara
- Range coordinates: 21°53′S 116°46′E

The Hamersley Range is a mountainous region of the Pilbara region of Western Australia. The range was named on 12 June 1861 by explorer Francis Thomas Gregory after Edward Hamersley, a prominent promoter of his exploration expedition to the northwest.

The range is one of the oldest mountain ranges on Earth and primarily consists of ancient rock formations, including banded iron formations (BIFs), that are about 2.5 billion years old. The Pilbara Craton, which underlies the Hamersley Range, dates back to around 3.4 billion years, but the range itself is younger than that. The deformation that began uplift of the region and created the tightly folded rocks of the range began around 2.2 billion years ago, during the Ophthalmia Orogeny. This would make it approximately the 6th oldest mountain range in the world.

Karijini National Park (formerly known as Hamersley Range National Park) lies within the range.

== History ==
The traditional Aboriginal owners of the area that the range runs through are the Puutu Kunti Kurrama and Pinikura peoples.

In 1999 a small range within the Hamersley was named the Hancock Range after the Hancock family, who were pioneers in the area. The Hancock range is east of Karijini National Park in a region of broad valleys and peaks that rise to almost 1,200 metres (3,937 ft). The Hancock Range is close to Mulga Downs Station, a property owned by the Hancock family and where Lang Hancock is buried.

== Geography ==
The range runs from the Fortescue River in the northeast, 460 kilometres (290 mi) to the south. The range contains Western Australia's highest point, Mount Meharry, which reaches approximately 1,249 metres (4,098 ft) AHD. There are many extensively eroded gorges, such as Wittenoom Gorge. The twenty highest peaks in Western Australia are in the Hamersley Range. Peaks in the range include Mount Bruce (1,234 metres (4,049 ft)), Mount Nameless/Jarndunmunha (1,115 metres (3,658 ft)), Mount Reeder Nichols (1,109 metres (3,638 ft)), Mount Samson (1,107 metres (3,632 ft)), Mount Truchanas (1,148 metres (3,766 ft)) and Mount Tom Price (775 metres (2,543 ft)).

Karijini National Park (formerly Hamersley National Park), one of Australia's largest national parks, is centred in the range.

== Mining ==
The range contains large deposits of iron ore, producing a large proportion of Australia's iron ore exports. It is predominately associated with banded iron formation. Western Australia's major iron producers have mines, communities and railways that occur along the range. Rio Tinto operates several iron ore mines within the range, including Mount Tom Price, Marandoo, Brockman, Channar, West Angelas, Mesa A mine, and Paraburdoo. Over 100 million tonnes (220 billion pounds) of iron ore is removed from the range every year.

Existence of crocidolite (blue asbestos) in the Hamersley Range has been known since 1915. In 1917 crocidolite was discovered at Wittenoom, it was mined from the 1930s and was discontinued in 1966 because of unprofitable production costs leaving behind the largest contaminated site in the southern hemisphere, an area nearly 1/5 the size of the Chernobyl exclusion zone area. Wittenoom was Australia's only blue asbestos mining town.

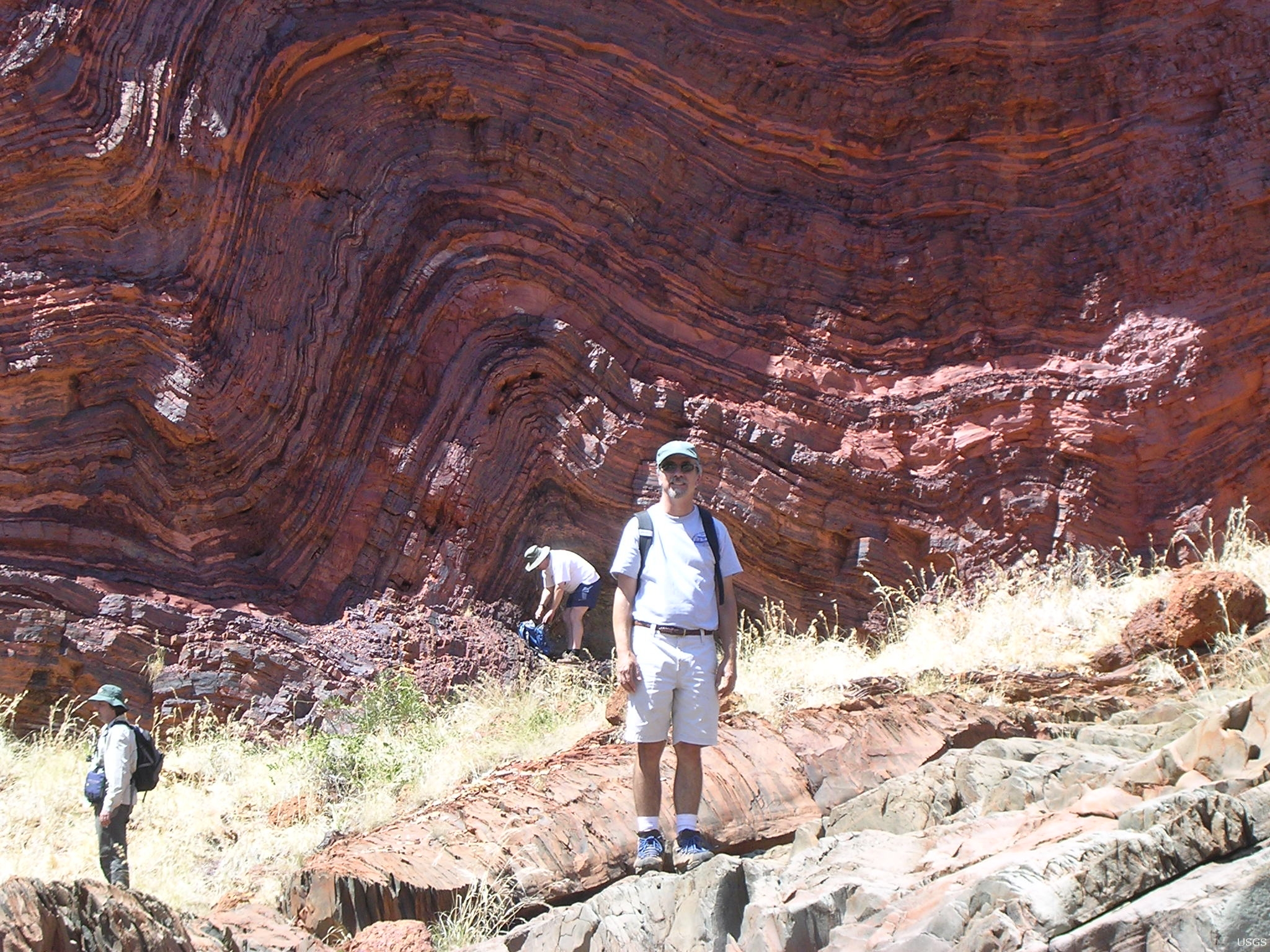
Geologist standing in front of folded layers of banded iron formation of Hamersley Range

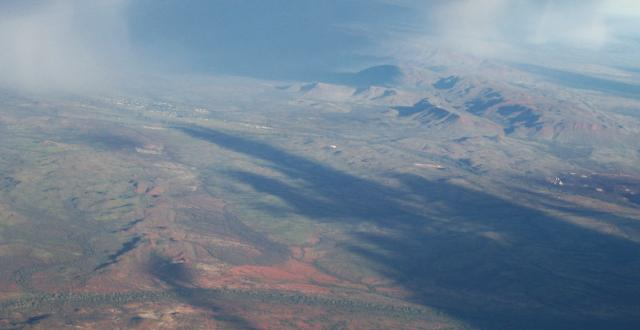
Paraburdoo and the Hamersley Range from the air

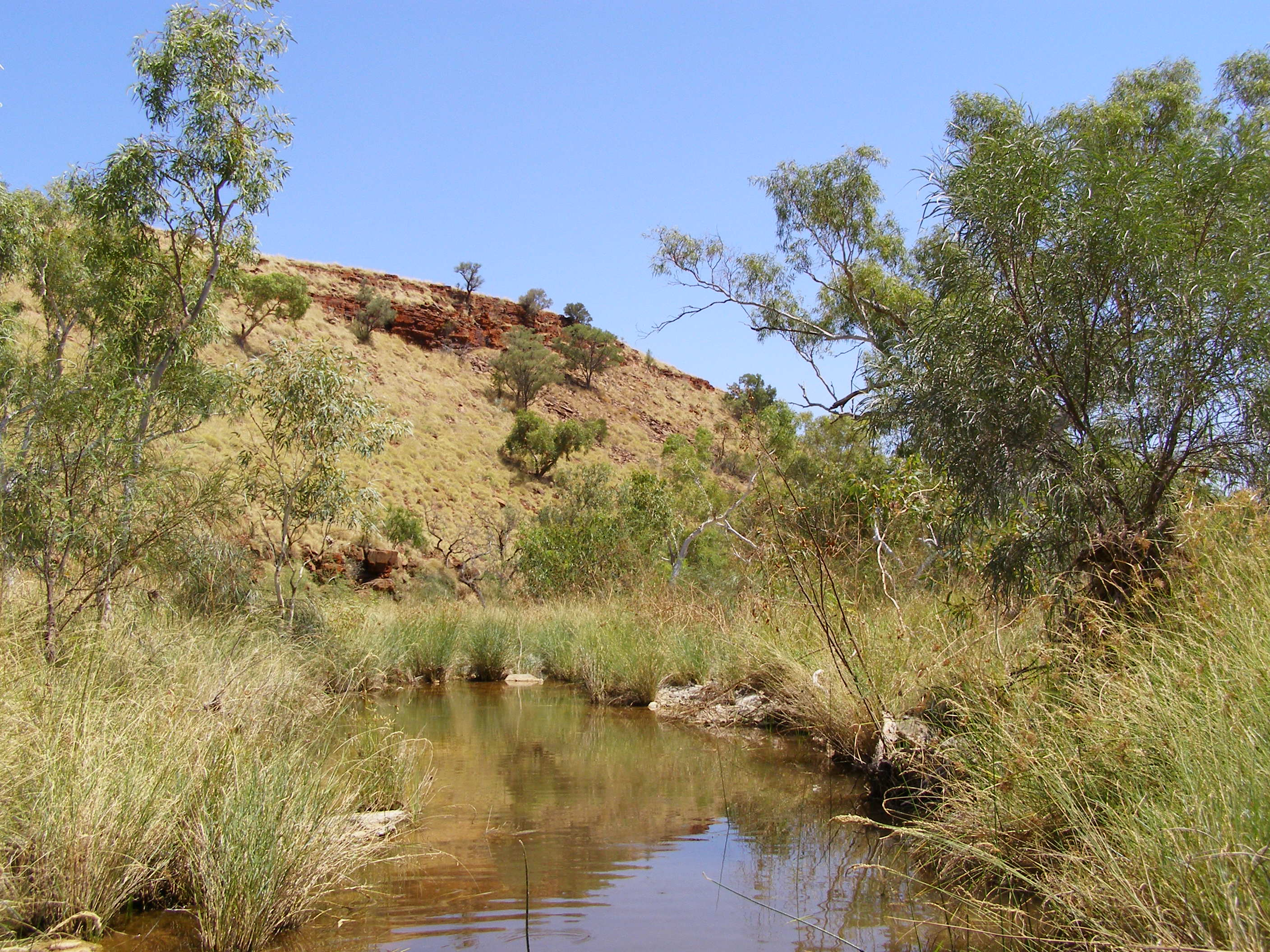
Hamersley Range, Pilbara region

=== Juukan Gorge ===
A cave in Juukan Gorge, about 60 kilometres (37 mi) from Mount Tom Price, was one of the oldest in the western Pilbara region, and the only inland site in Australia to show signs of continuous human occupation through the Ice Age. The cave was destroyed by Rio Tinto along with another Aboriginal sacred site on 23 May 2020 as part of their expansion of the Brockman 4 mine.

== See also ==
- Karijini National Park
- Ophthalmia Range
