= Rudge (surname) =

Rudge is a surname. Notable people with this surname include:

- Alan Rudge (born 1937), British electrical engineer
- Anne Rudge (1761–1836), English botanist
- Antonietta Rudge (1885–1974), Brazilian pianist
- Chris Rudge (born 1945), Canadian business executive
- Dale Rudge (born 1963), English footballer
- Daniel Rudge (1840–1880), English engineer
- Edward Rudge (disambiguation), several people
- Emily Rudge, English rugby league player
- Fanny Rudge (1878–1972), birth name of Fanny Dango, English comedienne, singer and actress
- Humphrey Rudge (born 1977), Dutch footballer
- John Rudge (disambiguation), several people
- Letitia Rudge (1861–1923), birth name of Letty Lind, English actress and dancer
- Lloyd Rudge (1934–1990), English cricketer
- Mary Rudge (1842–1919), English chess master
- Myles Rudge (1926–2007), English songwriter
- Olga Rudge (1895–1996), American violinist
- Peter Rudge (born 1981), British rowing cox
- Rudge Sisters (19th century), British actresses-dancers
- Sarah Rudge (1870–1920), birth name of Millie Hylton, English actress, dancer and male impersonator
- Selena Rudge (born 1975), English rugby union player
- Thomas Rudge (c. 1753–1825), English churchman, Archdeacon of Gloucester
- Will Rudge (born 1983), English cricketer

== See also ==
- Rudge
