= Croydon Station =

Pastoral lease in Western Australia

Coordinates: 21°7′12″S 117°48′23″E

Location in Western Australia

Croydon Station, often spelt as Croyden Station, is a pastoral lease and sheep station.

== Description ==
It is located approximately 70 kilometres (43 mi) south west of Port Hedland in the Pilbara region of Western Australia.

The property occupies an area of approximately 450,000 acres (182,109 ha) and is composed mostly of rolling plains; the Sherlock River runs through the property with pools providing good watering points for stock.

The relatively small 48,562 hectares (119,999 acres) Coolawanyah Station (located between Tambrey and Hooley Stations) was originally an outcamp of Hamersley and Croydon Stations.

== History ==
The lease was first taken up by the Robinson family from Brookton, when Edward Robinson, John Seabrook and W Robinson left the family's property near Pingelly with 3,000 sheep in November 1878. The sheep were broken into three flocks with an Aboriginal drover and one of the family members assigned to each flock. The groups passed through Beverley, York, Western Australia, Northam and New Norcia on the way before arriving at Croydon in 1879.

Mr E. Robinson left Croydon in 1886 to purchase Helena Farm from H. Brockman for £3000.

In the 1890s the McRae Brothers owned the station and had 32 Aboriginal men, 38 women and 13 children who were used as a source of labour. The station employees were given a new set of clothes every year in lieu of pay and were allowed to hunt native game, but only in their own time.

The station suffered the loss of 800 sheep following a storm and resulting floods in 1894.

Another storm swept over the area in 1898 causing even more damage. D. MacRae reported damage to the homestead and other buildings and waters rising to within 3 feet (1 m) of the 1894 watermark. No stock losses occurred, with livestock being removed from the most affected paddocks the day before. 12 inches (305 mm) of rain fell over the course of a day.

Ernest Anderton Hall (nephew of William Shakespeare Hall) bought Croydon from the McRaes in July 1911 for £27,270, after he sold Yandayarra Station, and Croydon was managed by his cousin Harold Aubrey Hall. At this time Croydon was described as comprising sixteen paddocks and twelve good wells with windmills, tanks, and troughs. Ernest Hall also eventually acquired Sherlock Station, and later sold Croydon to James Nicholas.

Croydon was advertised in 1919 when Nicholas sold three properties in the northwest, Croydon, Peron Peninsula and Dirk Hartog Stations. At the time Croydon occupied an area of 450,001 acres (182,109 ha) and was stocked with 11,000 sheep and 2,700 cattle.

By 1925 the station was owned by Clarence G. Meares.

In 1928 the station was up for sale and occupied an area of 402,492 acres (162,883 ha) with a lease that expired in 1948 and costing the owner £1 per 1000 acre. At this stage approximately 200,000 acres (80,937 ha) were fenced and the station was sub-divided into 14 paddocks. The station is well watered and has the Sherlock River running for about 40 miles (64 km) through the property including about 20 permanent pools. Additionally the station had at least 14 wells equipped with windmills. The station was running 20,000 sheep, 600 cattle, 50 horses, a donkey and camel team as well as the usual station plant.

The station was sold after the deaths of both Duncan McRae and Samuel Peter Mackay.

The station received 60 breeding rams in 1939, which arrived in Roebourne aboard Koolinda.

In 1947 the station manager, John Minson, was seriously injured when his horse tripped and fell on him as he was out mustering. He was taken 20 miles (32 km) back to the homestead on horseback, then to Whim Creek by truck and then taken by flying doctors to Port Hedland.

The station was owned in 2008 by Peter Cook, a pharmacist, who owned other properties in the Pilbara, including Hooley, Mallina, Pyramid and Sherlock Stations.

== See also ==
- List of ranches and stations
