= George River (Western Australia) =

River in the Pilbara region of Western Australia

Coordinates: 21.381°S 117.342°E

Location
- Country: Australia

Physical characteristics
- Source
  - location: Chichester Range
  - elevation: 384 metres (1,260 ft)
- Mouth
  - location: Sherlock River
  - elevation: 5 metres (16 ft)
- Length: 45 kilometres (28 mi)
- Basin size: 2,824 square kilometres (1,090 sq mi)

The George River is a river in the Pilbara region of Western Australia. The river was named on 16 July 1861 by the surveyor and explorer Frank Gregory, who was conducting an expedition in the area. It is not known after whom he named the river.

The river rises in the Chichester Range and flows northerly through the Millstream-Chichester National Park, cutting across the North West Coastal Highway before discharging into the Little Sherlock River east of Roebourne.

The George has three tributaries; The Little George River, Narrina Creek and Grant Spring Creek. It also flows through several semi-permanent water holes including Yanna Pool, white Spring Pool and Terenar Pool.

The river is part of the Port Hedland coastal drainage basin along with the Maitland, Harding, Sherlock, Turner River and Yule River.
