= Millstream Station =

Former sheep/cattle station in Western Australia

Coordinates: 21.5884°S 117.0754°E

Location in Western Australia

Millstream Station is a defunct pastoral lease that was once a sheep station and cattle station in Western Australia. The property is now part of Millstream Chichester National Park.

It is located approximately 70 kilometres (43 mi) south of Roebourne and 80 km (50 mi) east of Pannawonica in the Pilbara region of Western Australia. The park shares a boundary with Coolawanyah Station to the east and Hamersley Station to the south. The property was located on Millstream Creek, just before it joins the Fortescue River, one of the few permanent watercourses in the area and the Chichester Range.

Francis Thomas Gregory was the first European to discover the area during an expedition in 1861. A lease was taken up for the area in 1865 by William Taylor, who ran sheep in the district. Soon after, in 1866, McRae and McKenzie took over the leases and they remained there until 1879.

The Chichester Range National Park was set aside and officially named in 1970. Millstream Station was integrated into the park in 1982.

== See also ==
- List of ranches and stations
- List of pastoral leases in Western Australia
