= Copper mining in Western Australia =

Mining activity in Western Australia

- Position of Western Australia within Australia highlighted

Location
- State: Western Australia
- Country: Australia

Regulatory authority
- Authority: Department of Mines, Industry Regulation and Safety
- Website: http://www.dmp.wa.gov.au/index.aspx

Production
- Commodity: Copper
- Production: ▼119,128 tonnes
- Value: ▼ A$1.401 billion
- Employees: ▼1,994 (FTE Base metals combined)^{[1]}
- Year: 2022–23

Copper mining in Western Australia is relatively minor on a world scale, accounting for less than one percent of the world's production in 2021–22.

As of 2022, is the sixth most-valuable commodity in the state. It reached its highest-ever sales value in 2021–22 at almost A$2 billion and experienced a growth in production again after having experienced the lowest level in over a decade in the previous year.

Mining for copper in Western Australia is either carried out in designated copper mines, like the Golden Grove mine, the DeGrussa mine and the Jaguar mine and as a by-product, from the Nova and Savannah Mine, nickel mines, and the Boddington gold mine.

Copper production in Western Australia has fluctuated somewhat but nevertheless grown considerably. In 1990–91, the state produced 14,980 tonnes of copper, a figure that had grown ten-fold by 2010 and reached a peak of 211,186 in 2014. Similarly, the value of the industry has grown from A$23.9 million in 1990–91 to almost A$2 billion in 2021–22.

== History ==
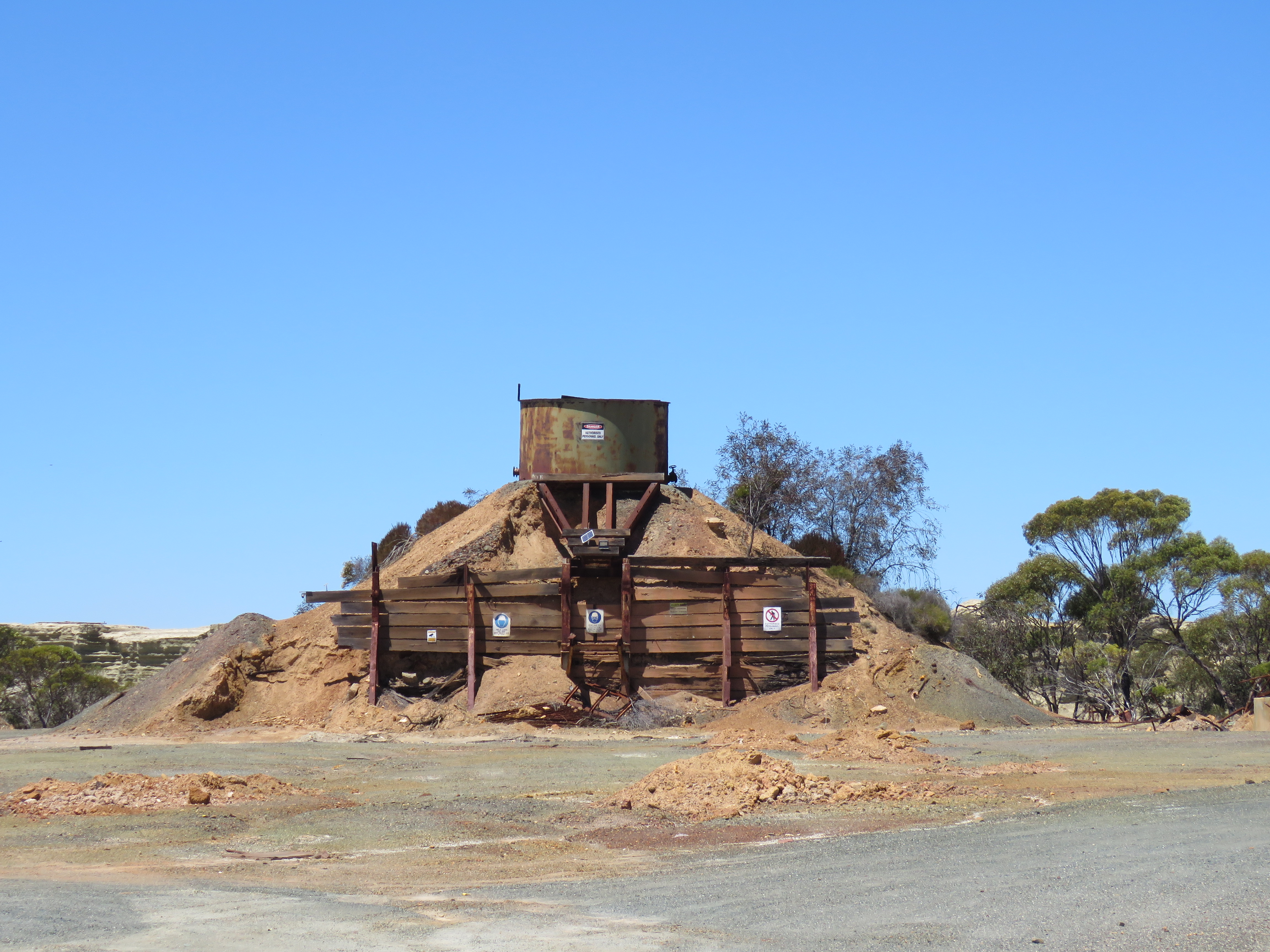
The historic Elverdton Copper-Gold Mine at Ravensthorpe

The origins of commercial copper mining in Western Australia date back to 1842, when a copper deposit was discovered at Wanerenooka, near the present-day Northampton. In the late 1890s and early 1900s there were small finds such as the Whim Creek copper mine in the Pilbara, and the Kimberley region.

Historical copper mining locations in Western Australia included many mines extracting other minerals at the same operation, where copper tonnage recovered was small. In the early twentieth century, most operations were small, and lasted a short duration. Northampton had copper mining as early as the 1860s, through to the 1890s.

Post-Second World War operations are the Elverdton Mine, near Ravensthorpe, which operated between 1956 and 1972, and the Thaduna Mine, near Wiluna, which was active intermittently from 1955 to 1971. In 1960, the leading copper mine in Western Australia was the Copper Hills Mine, located in the Pilbara and operational until 1963, with mining also carried out at Elverdton, Thaduna and the Kumarina Mine, the later deposit having been discovered before the First World War and mined intermittently until 1973.

By the late 1970s, copper was only mined as a by-product in nickel mines in Western Australia, with between 1,500 and 1,700 tonnes mined annually and a production value of around A$2 million.

Newer operations are the Teutonic Bore Mine, located near the Jaguar Mine, which operated from 1980 to 1985, owned by the Seltrust Mining Corporation. Teutonic Bore, upon opening, had a daily capacity to treat 1,000 tonnes of ore, and an annual capacity of 300,000 tonnes. Apart from copper, the mine also produced silver and zinc.

More prominent and longer-running was the Nifty copper mine, which operated from 1993 to 2019, while the Horseshoe Lights Mine, a combined gold and copper mine, operated from the late 1980s to 1994.

Historical production in Western Australia has been limited. In the early 1980s, Teutonic Bore was the only copper mine in the state, producing less than 3,500 tonnes of copper at a value of between A$3 and 4 million just before its closure. By the early 1990s, copper mining in Western Australia produced around 12,000 tonnes annually at a value of A$20 million from three locations, the Golden Grove and Telfer Mines and Kambalda.

=== Current mining operations ===
Major copper mining locations in Western Australia with Perth as a reference

The following companies operated copper mines in Western Australia in 2022–23, according to the Department of Mines, Industry Regulation and Safety. To qualify for the department's official list of principal mining projects an operation has to either had mineral sales valued at more than $5 million, or, for operations where such figures are not reported, had a minimum of 50 employees:

Mine	Owner	Location	Production (tonnes)	Period	Source
Boddington gold mine	Newmont	Shire of Boddington	44,450^{[1]}	2023	
DeGrussa Mine	Sandfire Resources	Shire of Meekatharra	27,791^{[2]}	2022–23	
Golden Grove mine	29Metals Limited	Shire of Yalgoo	18,100^{[3]}	2023	
Jaguar Mine	Aeris Resources	Shire of Leonora	3,100^{[4]}	2022–23	
Nova Operations	IGO Limited	Shire of Dundas	10,266^{[5]}	2022–23	
Savannah Mine	Panoramic Resources	Shire of Halls Creek	3,129^{[6]}	2022–23	
Telfer mine	Newmont	Shire of East Pilbara	17,000^{[7]}	2022–23	

- ^[1] The Boddington gold mine also produced 745,000 ounces of gold in 2023
- ^[2] The DeGrussa Mine also produced 19,122 ounces of gold in 2022–23. Mining at DeGrussa ceased in October 2022, with the plant continuing to process existing stockpiles only
- ^[3] The Golden Grove mine also produced 14,000 ounces of gold, 775,000 ounces of silver, 1,170 tonnes of lead and 51,500 tonnes of zinc in 2023
- ^[4] The Jaguar Mine also produced 22,500 tonnes of zinc, 718,000 ounces of silver and 3,000 ounces of gold in 2022–23. The mine was subsequently placed in care and maintenance in September 2023.
- ^[5] The Nova Operations also produced 22,915 tonnes of nickel and 803 of cobalt in 2022–23
- ^[6] The Savannah Mine also produced 5,402 tonnes of nickel and 368 of cobalt in 2022–23
- ^[7] The Telfer mine also produced 349,000 ounces of gold and 208,000 ounces of silver in 2022–23

== Export ==
In 2021–22, over seventy percent of the state's copper concentrate production went to South Korea (27 percent), the Philippines (24 percent) and Japan (22 percent). Germany and Finland followed next in this list with nine and five percent each respectively.

== Environmental issues ==
In 2019, the owners of the Whim Creek copper mine were handed an Environmental Protection Notice by the Department of Water and Environmental Regulation because of seepage of heavy metals from the mine into the Balla Balla River, considered a serious pollution risk. While in care and maintenance and with no active mining, Black Rock Minerals re-processed existing stockpiles through a small process plant and heap leach. Copper levels of 3.5 milligrams per litre were recorded in the local drinking water, well above the permitted level of 0.002 milligrams per litre. The small scale re-processing at Whim Creek eventually ceased in October 2019.

== Statistics ==
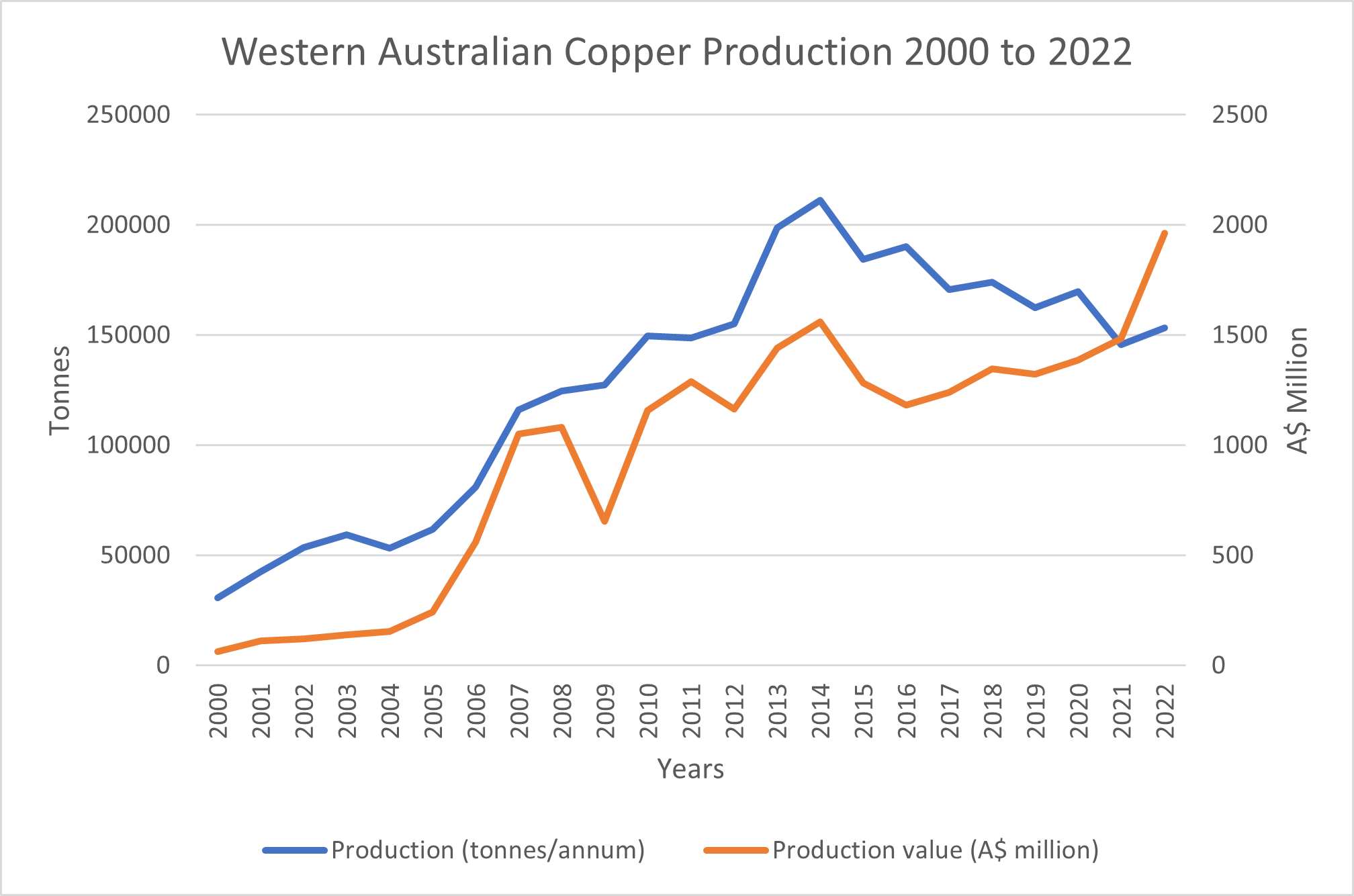
Western Australian copper production and value from 2000 to 2022

Annual statistics for the Western Australian copper mining industry. Figures are for financial year, which, in Australia, runs from 1 July to 30 June. Employment figures are for the base metal mining industry overall:

Subject	1990	1991	1992	1993	1994	1995	1996	1997	1998	1999
Production (tonnes/annum)	14,980	12,000	12,002	22,920	32,460	29,200	23,690	27,730	29,430	24,440
Production value (A$ million)	23.92	20.35	17.44	27.44	40.26	76.54	65.42	58.98	61.12	43.71

Subject	2000	2001	2002	2003	2004	2005	2006	2007	2008	2009
Production (tonnes/annum)	30,730	42,620	53,500	59,410	53,290	61,930	81,200	115,980	124,530	127,330
Production value (A$ million)	64.62	111.12	122.57	138.57	155.82	243.73	559.85	1,052.5	1,080.6	654.34
Employees	1,331	1,301	1,295	1,100	888	670	912	2,241	2,242	1,456

Subject	2010	2011	2012	2013	2014	2015	2016	2017	2018	2019
Production (tonnes/annum)	149,810	148,760	155,080	198,610	211,186	184,495	190,275	170,730	174,074	162,483
Production value (A$ million)	1,156.7	1,290.1	1,165.5	1,441.2	1,559.6	1,283.1	1,181.3	1,240.5	1,347.8	1,321.6
Employees	1,926	2,317	2,907	2,882	2,649	2,531	2,358	2,239	2,535	2,626

Subject	2020	2021	2022	2023
Production (tonnes/annum)	169,888	145,853	153,321	119,128
Production value (A$ billion)	1,386.8	1,485.1	1,963.4	1,401
Employees (Full time)	2,075	1,894	2,072	1,994
Employees (all personnel on site)	2,636	2,319	2,471	^{[1]}

== Notes ==
- ^[1] Full time employees only. Up until 2022, the Western Australian Mineral and Petroleum Statistics Digest listed a combined figure of both full time employees and on-site personnel but the latter was not included in the 2022–23 edition, which only listed full time employees.
