= Pyramid Station =

Pastoral lease in Western Australia

Coordinates: 21°03′21.15″S 117°26′34.06″E

Location in Western Australia

Pyramid Station is a pastoral lease and cattle station located approximately 100 kilometres (62 mi) east of Karratha in the Pilbara region of Western Australia. The station has also previously run sheep on its pastures.

Covering an area of 97,000 hectares (239,692 acres), the station is situated in a bluetongue disease quarantine area and runs a herd of Brahman cattle, most of which are exported to Indonesia. The station consists mostly of open plains that are well covered in Mitchell, bundle-bundle and other grasses. The plains are interspersed with broken hilly country studded with saltbush.

The homestead and outbuildings are situated on a level plain overlooking the George River from the eastern bank. King's Pyramid, the 152-metre (500 ft) hill from which the station takes its name, is located 14 kilometres (9 mi) to the south.

The station was initially established in 1865 by Alexander Robert Richardson, his elder brother John Elliott Richardson, and their cousin A.E. Anderson. The Richardsons were among the seven shareholders in the Portland Squatting Company. The group left Victoria aboard Maria Ross along with 1600 ewes and set up the station along the George River then peacock runs out along other watercourses.

In 1869 the group divided their flock with the Richardsons and Jack Edgar controlling 4500 sheep at Pyramid and buying out the other partners from 1869 to 1872.

Another previous owner of the station was Eva Broadhurst, who was much admired by the explorer Frank Hann, who named several geographical features after her. Her grave is situated not far from the station homestead. Her husband H.T Broadhurst arrived at Pyramid in 1893 and the couple lived there until Eva died at 38 years of age in 1909.

The station suffered damages to the cost of £300 following a storm and resulting floods in 1894.

The Broadhurst family sold the station in 1910; J. G. Meares sold his share of the nearby Sherlock Station in 1910 to Samuel Peter Mackay and bought Pyramid Station. Meares paid £28,000 for the station, which was considered good value at the time. The station encompassed an area of 330,000 acres (133,546 ha) and supported 20,000 sheep, 400 cattle and 200 horses. The manager of the station at the time was Mr Crofton, who later went on to manage Balfour Downs Station.

In 1911, MacKay unsuccessfully bid £25,000 for the Croydon Station, which adjoins Pyramid.

Meares expanded his land-holding when he purchased Woodbrook and Andover Stations for £32,000 in 1912. Woodbrook adjoined Pyramid in 1912; Meares' purchase included all the stock for both properties.

1914 was a dry year with the district receiving little rain, but 33,000 sheep were shorn that year under the supervision of the Meares family, who still owned the station.

In 1915 Meares received 34 stud rams, which arrived from interstate aboard SS Charon on its last sea voyage.

The station was owned by a pharmacist named Peter Cook in 2012. Cook also owned four other stations in the Pilbara. The station was managed by Glenn Connell and sold about 500 head of cattle per year which are shipped out via Port Hedland. Pyramid is operating under the Crown Lease number CL927-1965 and has the Land Act number LA3114/492.

In 2015 it was purchased by Bettini Bros (now Bettini Beef) in a package with Mallina and Sherlock Stations. The Bettinis still owned the lease in 2018.

== See also ==
- List of ranches and stations
