= Alexandra Theatre, London =

Coordinates: 51.5528°N 0.0751°W

The Alexandra Theatre was a theatre located in the Stoke Newington district of London. Built in 1897, it was located at 65 and 67 Stoke Newington Road where the present-day Alexandra Court now stands. The theatre was demolished in the 1960s.

== History ==
Opened on 27 December 1897 as The Alexandra Theatre and Opera House, it was designed by theatre architect Frank Matcham for F. W. Purcell. Upon opening, the theatre had a capacity of 2,025, spread across pit, traditional circle and gallery seating. In 1904, city records list the theatre’s capacity as 1,710, along with an assessed value of £1,250. The theatre's first performance was the 27 December 1897 staging of Dick Whittington, an adaption of the pantomime Dick Whittington and His Cat.

The theatre was operated by F. W. Purcell until 1905 when he sold it to new owners. The theatre’s new owners changed its name to the Palace Theatre of Varieties. However, in 1909, it was sold again, this time to Stoll Moss Empires, Ltd., who reverted it back to its original name, the Alexandra Theatre and placed it under the management of Oswald Stoll. In the late 1910s Stoll had screens, projectors and other equipment needed for cinema projection installed and by 1922 cine-variety programs were being presented to audiences. The theatre also presented film matinees and on Sundays, on which, by law, no live performances could be done, the theatre screened films exclusively.

In 1932, the Alexandra was purchased by Standard Cinema Properties Ltd. and converted to screen films exclusively. However, in 1934 the theatre came under independent management and, in addition to reverting to featuring a mixture of live and film performances, a modern (for the time) sound system was installed. A few years later, the theatre closed with the entry of the United Kingdom into World War II.

The Alexandra reopened in 1945 after the war ended and subsisted on a variety of live performances, such as boxing matches, Yiddish theatre productions, and special events. During this period, the theatre hosted performances from the Motley Theatre Design Group, including a 1947 staging of an adaptation of Hans Christian Andersen's The Snow Queen, adapted by Evgeny Schwartz. The Alexandra remained open and staging productions and events until finally closing its doors for good in 1950. Thereafter, the building stood empty for many years before being demolished in the early 1960s so that the Alexandra Court tenement could be built.

== Selected productions ==
- Snow Queen (1947) written by Evgeny Schwartz, directed by Michel Saint-Denis, starring Edgar Wreford, adapted from the Hans Christian Andersen story by Suria Magito.
- Boys Will Be Boys (1932), written by Archie Pitt, music by Gordon Courtney.
- Up in Mabel's Room (1928), written by Wilson Collison, music by Otto Harbach.
- Sinbad the Sailor (1899-1900), starring Lydia Flopp.
- Dick Whittington (1897), by Sir Augustus Harris, Cecil Raleigh, and Henry Hamilton, starring Billie Barlow.
