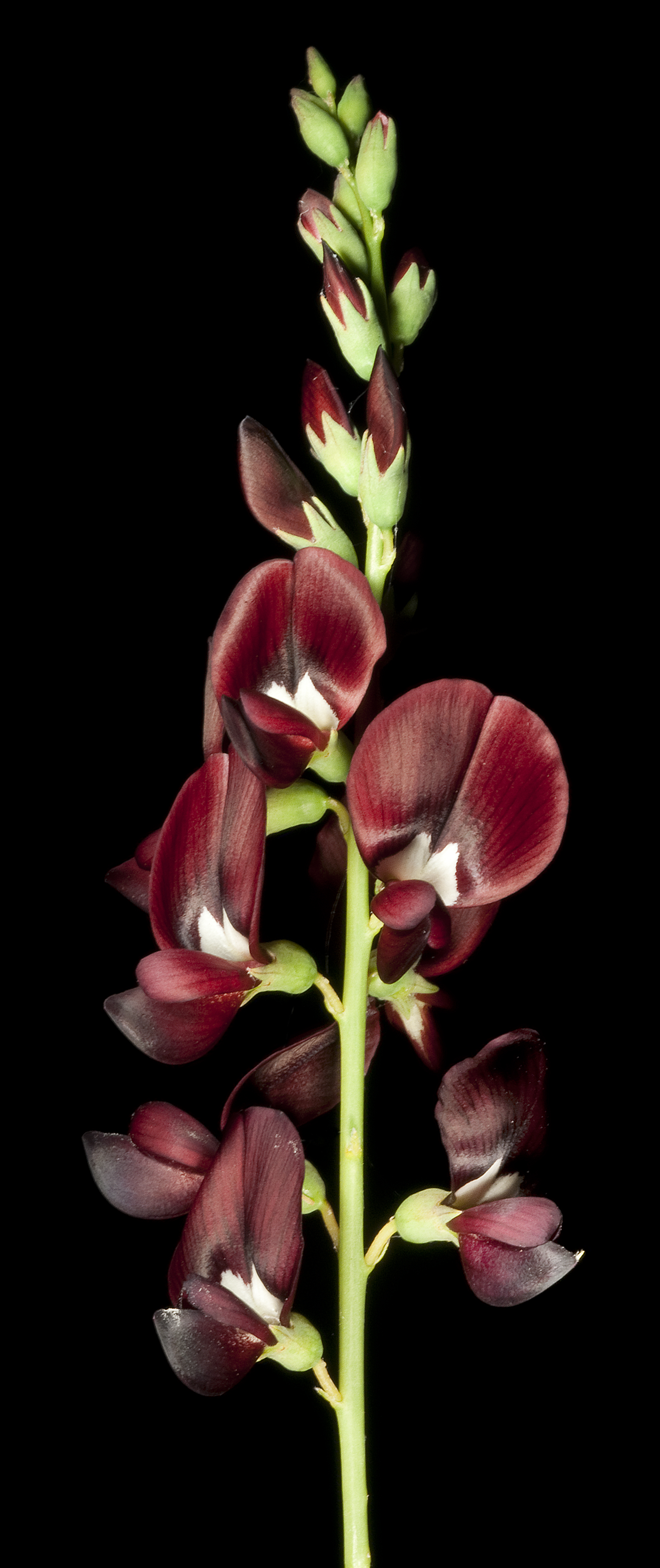

Scientific classification
- Kingdom: Plantae
- Clade: Tracheophytes
- Clade: Angiosperms
- Clade: Eudicots
- Clade: Rosids
- Order: Fabales
- Family: Fabaceae
- Subfamily: Faboideae
- Genus: Swainsona
- Species: S. stenodonta

Binomial name
- Swainsona stenodonta F.Muell.

Synonyms
- Swainsonia stenodonta F.Muell. orth. var.

= Swainsona stenodonta =

Species of flowering plant

Swainsona stenodonta is a species of flowering plant in the family Fabaceae and is endemic to the north-west of Western Australia. It is an erect annual herb, with imparipinnate leaves with 7 to 13 narrowly linear or oblong leaflets, and racemes of up to 30 or more dark brownish-red to dark purple flowers.

== Description ==
Swainsona stenodonta is an erect, annual herb with imparipinnate leaves up to 70 mm (2.8 in) long with 7 to 13 narrowly linear or oblong leaflets, the lower leaflets mostly 15–25 mm (0.59–0.98 in) long and 1–3 mm (0.039–0.118 in) wide. There is a stipule about 4 mm (0.16 in) long at the base of the short petiole. The flowers are arranged in racemes up to 150 mm (5.9 in) long with up to 30 flowers on a peduncle 0.5–1.5 mm (0.020–0.059 in) wide, each flower about 10 mm (0.39 in) long on a pedicel about 3 mm (0.12 in) long. The sepals are joined at the base, forming a tube 2–3 mm (0.079–0.118 in) long, the sepal lobes up to about as long as the tube. The petals are dark brownish-red to dark purple, sometimes almost black, the standard petal about 10 mm (0.39 in) long and 6–7 mm (0.24–0.28 in) wide, the wings about 8 mm (0.31 in) long, and the keel usually 8–10 mm (0.31–0.39 in) long and 2–3 mm (0.079–0.118 in) deep. Flowering occurs from July to October, and the fruit is mostly 10–12 mm (0.39–0.47 in) long with the remains of the style 5 mm (0.20 in) long.

== Taxonomy ==
Swainsona stenodonta was first formally described in 1879 by Ferdinand von Mueller in his Fragmenta Phytographiae Australiae from specimens collected near the junction of the Sherlock and Yule Rivers by John Forrest. The specific epithet (stenodonta) means "narrow tooth", referring to the sepal lobes.

== Distribution and habitat ==
This species of pea grows in stony soils near watercourses, sandstone rocks and plains in the Pilbara bioregion of northern Western Australia.
