= Sherlock Station =

Pastoral station in Western Australia

Coordinates: 20°53′43″S 117°38′42″E

Location in Western Australia

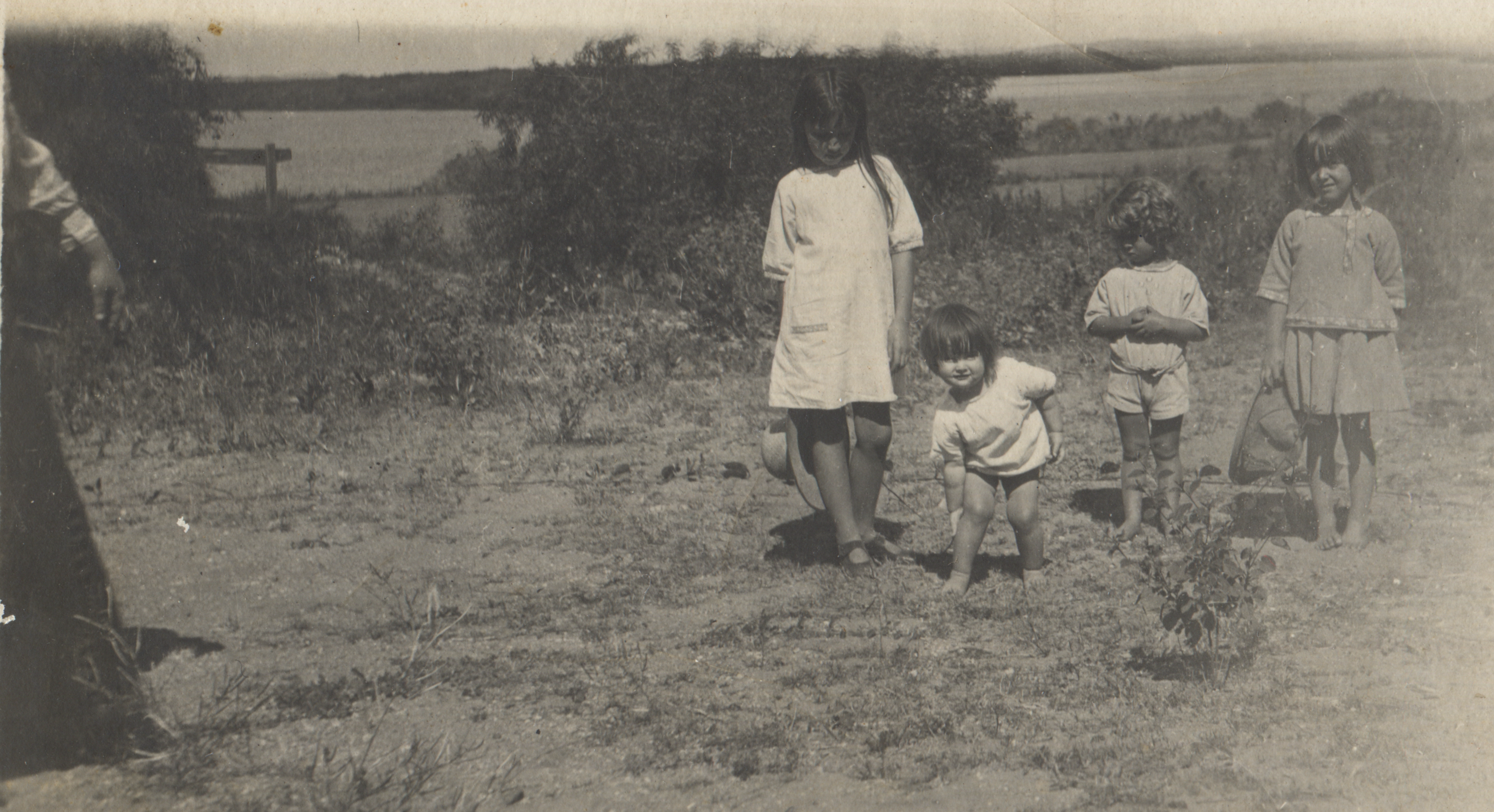
Ernest Hall's son Reginald with his cousins at Sherlock Station in about 1921.

Sherlock Station is a pastoral lease and sheep station located approximately 54 kilometres (34 mi) East of Roebourne in the Pilbara region of Western Australia. Covering an area of 216,700 acres (87,695 ha) pasture, the lease provides good grazing land. In 2015 it was purchased by Bettini Bros, now Bettini Beef, in a package with Mallina and Pyramid Stations. The Bettinis still owned the lease in 2018. Sherlock is operating under the Crown Lease number CL311-1966 and has the Land Act number LA3114/558.

The homestead was placed on the Register of the National Estate in 1986. The homestead complex is composed of the main homestead, the kitchen block, meat-house, storeroom, quarters, stables, wool-shed and overseer's house, all spread apart in a typical Pilbara layout. The main buildings are constructed from rubble masonry and have corrugated iron roofs, mostly with Pilbara vaulting.

In 1879 John and Emma Withnell bought the station after selling Mount Welcome Station. They retired to Guildford in 1890. Emma Withnell was known as Mother of the North West among the Aborigine people in the area as she often tended to the sick and delivered babies in her own house.

1882 was a dry year on the station when John Withnell contracted a Mr Lock to cut 7,500 fencing posts and erect 27 miles (43 km) of boundary fencing.

The station was sold by John Withnell Snr. to Messrs Meares and Withnell in 1890 for £24,000. The cost included all of the plant and equipment, 16,000 sheep, 50 head of cattle and 60 horses.

A large grass fire occurred at the station in 1893 when a station hand accidentally started it when lighting a campfire. The fire cost Withnell and Meares a paddock 20 miles (32 km) long that has been destocked for 6 months in preparation for lambing.

The station suffered damage to the homestead, stables and outbuildings along with the loss of 8,000 sheep following a storm and resulting floods in 1894.

A devastating cyclone tore through the area in 1898, with an Aboriginal woman being swept away along with her mia in the resulting flood waters. The shearing shed was also washed away with both the Sherlock and Balla Balla Rivers being in full flood. Meares and Withnell lost a large number of stock but the homestead was undamaged.

Another storm followed in 1902; the station received about 8 inches (203 mm) in the deluge. The nearby town of Balla Balla was almost submerged as the sea level rose to be almost level with the town.

Following a dry year, in 1908, 4,000 wethers were sold from the station.

J. G. Meares sold his share of the station in 1910 to Samuel Peter Mackay and bought the nearby Pyramid Station.

In 1912 two kangaroo hunters, Carl Hedman and Frank Deschow, were arrested at the station for sheep stealing.

The station had a bumper season in 1913 when good rains fell across the district. Grasses growing over 1 foot (0.30 m) and good lambing numbers were reported at Sherlock and surrounding stations, Pyramid and Malina. A flock of over 10,000 sheep were overlanded to Lower Clifton Downs Station.

Ernest A. Hall acquired the station in 1916 from Sam Mackay. Hall had previously owned Croydon Station before purchasing Sherlock. In 1923 Hall sold Sherlock to Edward Meares and acquired Wooramel Station.

Good rains fell at the station in 1928 with 2 inches (51 mm) falling in one day that year.

The station was sold in 1938 for an undisclosed amount by Messers A.E. Hardie and Son; the property carried 15,000 sheep, plant and homestead.

Cyclone Shirley struck the Pilbara coast in April 1966 and dumped 404 millimetres (16 in) of rain on the station. In December 1999 Cyclone John also flooded the area when over 300 millimetres (12 in) of rain fell.

The May family owned the station from the 1970s through to 1990.

The station was owned during the 2000s until 2015 by Peter Cook, a pharmacist, who also owned four other stations in the Pilbara including Croydon, Mallina and Pyramid Stations.

== See also ==
- List of pastoral leases in Western Australia
