= Balla Balla, Western Australia =

Pastoral lease in Western Australia

Coordinates: 20°47′52″S 117°48′15″E

Location in Western Australia

Balla Balla Station is a pastoral lease and cattle station located approximately 138 kilometres (86 mi) north of Karratha just off the North West Coastal Highway in the Pilbara region of Western Australia.

The station is also used for tourism purposes, with camping permitted, and renowned as being a good fishing location.

There was once a townsite on the coastal side of the station; the town of Balla Balla, was an important port in the area. The waters could be treacherous, with the first recorded drowning occurring in 1898.

Following the expansion of the gold mines at Whim Creek and copper mines at Elgin Creek in 1897 the town requested that an area of 30,000 acres (12,141 ha) surrounding the townsite be set aside as a public reserve. The area included Balla Balla Pool, a permanent pool of freshwater, which could be used by stock. At this time 20 teams of workmen were employed in carting goods from the mines using in excess of 70 camels.

A cyclone struck the town in 1898 destroying most of the buildings in the town. The post office, blacksmith, Chicago Hotel and woolshed were completely destroyed. The Balla Balla Hotel was partly deroofed and boats were sunk. Two people died from flying debris.

In 1902 a storm swept across the town, dumping a large amount of rain, and the sea level rose to be almost level with the town. Neighbouring Sherlock Station received about 200 millimetres (8 in) in the deluge. The port area was severely damaged with the sand ridges being washed away leaving the rails exposed.

A marine survey was conducted around the harbour area 1907 by Captain Airey, the master of the steamer Penguin. Besides the survey an estimate of the cost of building a causeway between the mainland at Balla Balla and Depuch Island was also to be prepared.

A cyclone in 1912 caused havoc in the port, sinking many vessels and drowning several men. Crown of England, Enterprise and Clyo were all sunk. The pearling fleet sought refuge in Balla Balla Creek and were unscathed. SS Koombana, which was sailing through the area, was also listed as missing.

The area is rich in minerals, particularly gold, and several mines operated in the vicinity. The leases pegged by a Mr Breen prior to 1926 were described by the prospector as "the best he had seen in the Nor' West". The Balla Balla Syndicate, an Adelaide base group of investors, sent Breen back to the area in 1926 with the equipment to build a 10-head battery to develop the mine.

== See also ==
- List of ranches and stations
- List of reduplicated Australian place names
- Balla Balla River
