= Mallina Station =

Pastoral lease in Western Australia

Coordinates: 20.6462°S 119.2509°E

Location in Western Australia

Mallina Station is a pastoral lease that was once a sheep station but now operates as a cattle station in Western Australia.

It is located approximately 86 kilometres (53 mi) south west of Port Hedland and 125 km (78 mi) south east of Karratha on the Peawah River in the Pilbara region of Western Australia.

== Background ==
The station was one of the earliest pastoral leases in the North West, with the lease being taken up by the Withnell family in the late 1870s or early 1880s. Gold was discovered on the property in January 1888. Jimmy and Harding Withnell were working on the property when they saw a crow sitting on their lunch box. Jimmy picked up a stone to throw at the crow and noticed light reflecting off particles of gold. This was one of the earliest reported discoveries of gold in the North West.

Roy Hill Station was established in 1886 by Nat Cooke, who owned Mallina Station. Mallina had suffered from several years drought, so Cooke was keen to secure new pastures.

The station was owned in 2008 by Peter Cook, a pharmacist, who owned other properties in the Pilbara including Croydon, Hooley, Pyramid and Sherlock Stations.

In 2015 it was purchased by Bettini Bros (now Bettini Beef) in a package with Pyramid and Sherlock Stations. The Bettinis still owned the leases in 2018.

== See also ==
- List of pastoral leases in Western Australia
