= Rudge Sisters =

British actresses and dancers

The Rudge Sisters were English actresses and dancers from Birmingham. Their father, Henry Rudge, was a brass founder and chandelier maker. Their mother, Elizabeth, had a brief acting career in the Birmingham area. They also had two brothers who became brass founders. The Rudge sisters were:

- Letitia Elizabeth Rudge – Letty Lind (1861–1923)
- Sarah Rudge – Millie Hylton (1870–1920)
- Elizabeth Rudge – Adelaide Astor (1873–1951; married George Grossmith Jr. in 1895)
- Lydia Rudge – Lydia Flopp (1877–1963)
- Fanny Rudge – Fanny Dango (1878–1972; married Samuel Peter Mackay in 1911)

Letty Lind

Millie Hilton

Adelaide Astor

Lydia Flopp

Fanny Dango

The sisters were primarily dancers, but later developed their singing talents, working variously in pantomime; variety and music hall; Victorian burlesque, often at the Gaiety Theatre, Alexandra Theatre and Daly's Theatre, London, in the 1880s and 90s; and Edwardian musical comedy.

Letty Lind became a famous skirt dancer and musical comedy star. Millie Hylton worked in the theatre and the music halls, eventually making a career in variety as a male impersonator and was the mother of actress Millie Sim (born 1895). Adelaide Astor, a West End actress, and her husband George Grossmith Jr. had three children, Ena Sylvia Victoria (1896–1944), who became a stage and film actress; George (1906–c. 1997), who became a theatrical manager; and Rosa Mary (1907–1988). Lydia Flopp appeared in pantomime. Fanny Dango worked in theatre in London and then had a long and successful career in Australia. While touring Australia, she made an astute property purchase, married a wealthy sheep farmer and settled there.
