= Rudge =

Rudge may refer to:

== Places ==
- Rudge, Shropshire, England, a settlement and civil parish
- Rudge, Somerset, England, a hamlet
- Rugde (Kristiansand), a neighbourhood in Kristiansand, Norway

== People ==
- Rudge (surname)

== Other uses ==
- Rudge Cup, an ancient Roman bronze cup found in 1725
- The title character of Barnaby Rudge, a novel by Charles Dickens

== See also ==
- Rudge-Whitworth, a British motorcycle, wheel and automobile manufacturer
