= Coolawanyah Station Airport =

Airport in Western Australia

- IATA: COY; ICAO: YCWY

Summary
- Airport type: Public
- Serves: Coolawanyah Station, Shire of Ashburton, Pilbara, Western Australia
- Coordinates: 21°47′39″S 117°45′33″E

Map
- Location of the airport in Western Australia
- Sources: Australian AIP

Coolawanyah Station Airport (IATA: COY, ICAO: YCWY) is an airport located 5 kilometres (3.1 mi) west of Coolawanyah Station, in the Shire of Ashburton, part of the Pilbara region of Western Australia.

== See also ==
- List of airports in Western Australia
- Aviation transport in Australia
