= Coolawanyah Station =

Pastoral lease in Western Australia

Coordinates: 21°48′18″S 117°48′22″E

Location in Western Australia

Coolawanyah Station, also spelt as Coolawaya Station, is a pastoral lease and sheep station located approximately 100 kilometres (62 mi) north of Tom Price, 150 kilometres (93 mi) south east of Karratha and 170 kilometres (106 mi) south west of Port Hedland, in the Shire of Ashburton, part of the Pilbara region of Western Australia. The property shares a boundary with Millstream Chichester National Park to the west.

The property was acquired by Roy Parsons and his partners in 1922 after he served in the navy during World War I. Parsons bought out his partners during the next few years, eventually owning the 1,204 square kilometres (465 sq mi) leasehold outright. In 1949 Parsons and Ted LeFroy formed the Coolawanyah Pastoral Company and acquired Tambrey and Hooley Stations, which they merged with Coolawanyah with a total size of 1,770 square kilometres (683 sq mi). Later they also leased Millstream Station from the Department of Water, creating a total leaseholding of 3,001 square kilometres (1,159 sq mi).

During the 1950s the property switched from sheep to cattle after suffering from dingo attacks. In 1956 Roy's youngest son, Les, took over management of the property.

The Parsons family are also related to the Withnell family and still ran the property in 2008 with Kim and Cindy Parsons managing the 3,000 square kilometres (1,158 sq mi) with a herd of 4,000 head of cattle.

== Transportation ==
The locality is served by the Coolawanyah Station Airport (IATA: COY, ICAO: YCWY).

== See also ==
- List of pastoral leases in Western Australia
