= Hooley Station =

Pastoral lease in Western Australia

Coordinates: 21.8836°S 118.2188°E

Location in Western Australia

Hooley Station is a pastoral lease that was once a sheep station but now operates as a cattle station in Western Australia.

It is located approximately 100 kilometres (62 mi) north of Tom Price and 170 km (106 mi) south east of Roebourne in the Pilbara region of Western Australia.

The station was owned in 2008 by Peter Cook, a pharmacist, who owned other properties in the Pilbara including Croydon, Mallina, Pyramid and Sherlock Stations.

In 2017 the property was owned by the Peter and Pol Edmunds, who once owned Mandora Station.

== See also ==
- List of pastoral leases in Western Australia
