= Shaw River (Western Australia) =

River in the Pilbara region of Western Australia,

Coordinates: 20°20′07″S 119°17′27″E

Location
- Country: Australia

Physical characteristics
- Source
  - location: Chichester Range
  - elevation: 510 metres (1,673 ft)
- Mouth
  - location: De Grey River
  - elevation: 23 metres (75 ft)
- Length: 160 km (99 mi)
- Basin size: 6,510 km^{2} (2,510 sq mi)
- Discharge
  - average: 191 GL/a (6.1 m^{3}/s; 214 cu ft/s)

The Shaw River is an ephemeral river in the Pilbara region of Western Australia. It was named by explorer F.T. Gregory on 21 August 1861 after Norton Shaw, Secretary of the Royal Geographical Society.

The headwaters of the river rise below the Chichester Range near Emu Springs and flow in a northerly direction through Hillside. The river is braided and has many islands in the riverbed including Long Island and Rocky Island. The river continues through Gorge Range and flows north until discharging into the De Grey River, of which it is a tributary, just south of the North West Coastal Highway approximately 50 kilometres (31 mi) East of Port Hedland.

The river has 23 tributaries including Big Creek, Tambourah Creek, Coolargarrak Creek, Dalton Creek and Miralga Creek. It also flows through one major pool, Coondina Pool.

During drought conditions the river can have zero flow for up to four years at a time.

The water quality of the river is dependent on flow but has an average salinity of 110 mg/L and a turbidity of 78 NTU.
