= Whim Creek copper mine =

Mine in Western Australia

Whim Creek Copper Mine
- Location in Western Australia
- Interactive map of Whim Creek Copper Mine
- Location: Whim Creek, Western Australia, Australia; 20°51′49″S 117°50′15″E
- Products: Copper
- Opened: 2005
- Closed: 2009
- Company: Anax Metals (80%) Develop Global Limited (20%)
- Website: anaxmetals.com.au develop.com.au
- Acquired: 2020 (Anax) 2010 (Develop)

The Whim Creek Copper Mine is a copper oxide mine, located in the City of Karratha in the Pilbara region of Western Australia.

In 2019, the mine was found to have caused pollution of the Balla Balla River with heavy metals.

== History ==
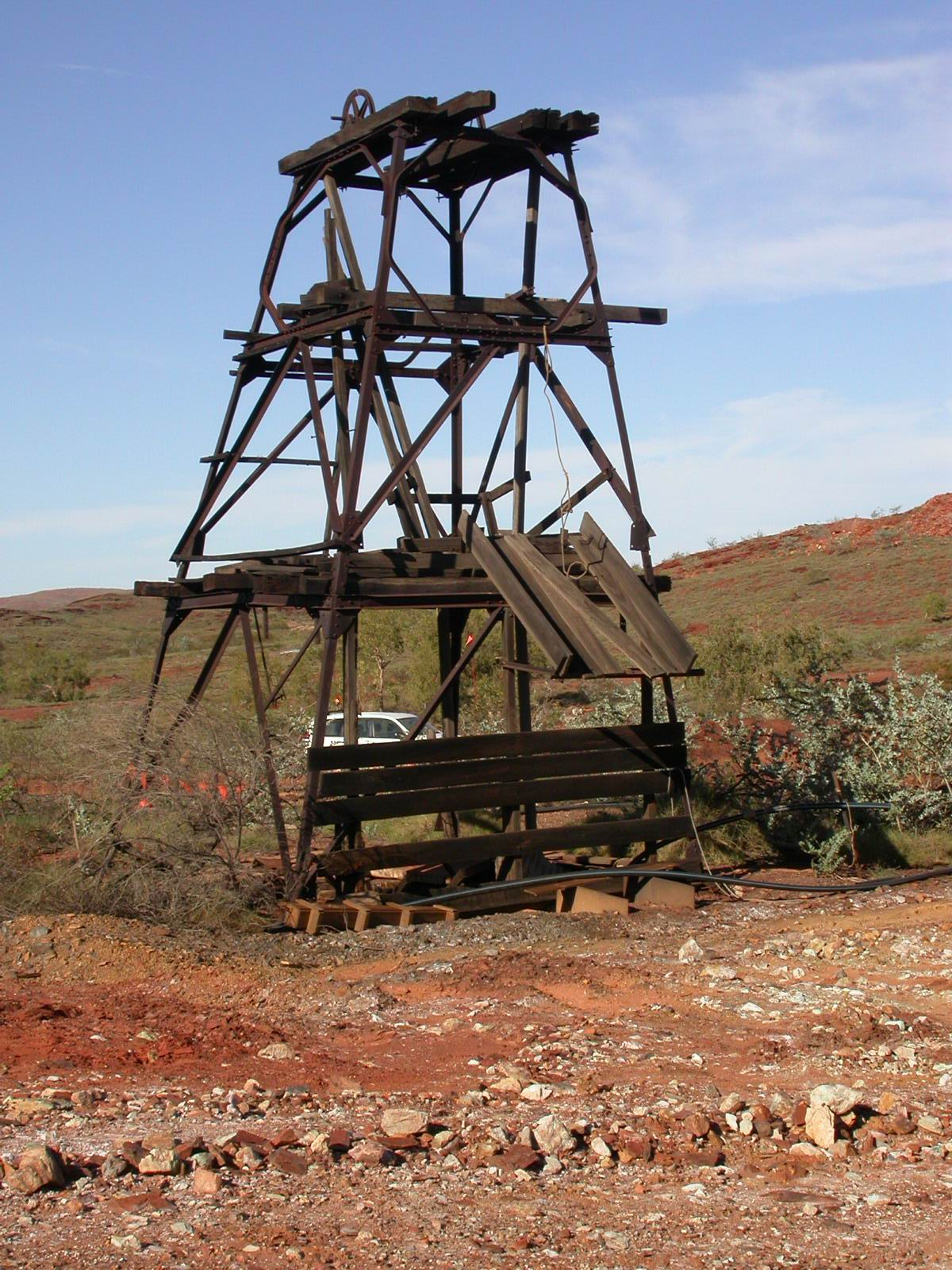
Old headframe from historic workings, Whim Creek

Copper was discovered several kilometres west of the town in 1872 and gold 20 kilometres north in 1887.

Copper has been mined on and off at Whim Creek over a period of 120 years. Copper was mined initially via a series of small adits and stopes into the Whim Creek and Mons Cupri deposits by artisanal miners, with records indicating that as early as 1882 small quantities of malachite, azurite, chrysocolla and other copper minerals were being won. Copper was shipped via a small port on the coast at the nearby town of Balla Balla. A single track narrow-gauge railway ran from Whim Creek to Balla Balla. At its peak, the town supported two hotels, a blacksmith, a police station and a horse track.

In the early 1900s a second period of mining began, with around 60,000 tonnes of copper concentrate produced mainly from the Whim Creek Mine.

In the 1960s Japanese interests undertook a resource drilling program, with diamond core drilling, and built a small oxide mining operation. This shut down in the early 1970s. The mine used two large diesel engines from World War One submarines to power the mine equipment. The engine blocks can still be seen on the site today.

=== Straits era ===
The leases passed to Whim Creek Consolidated Limited, but the company found profit elsewhere, and the mining leases were passed through several owners until the mid-1990s when Straits Resources Limited took over the tenure.

Straits undertook a resource definition drilling programme and upgraded the resource to around 10 million tonnes of ore grading 1% copper, predominantly composed of oxidised copper minerals such as malachite, azurite, chalcocite and chrysocolla. Other minerals noted within the ore bodies are willemite, sphalerite, chalcopyrite and rare native copper. The majority of resources were defined at the Mons Cupri deposit and the Whim Creek deposit.

Straits Resources Limited, after closure of the Girilambone Copper Mine in 2001–02, investigated the feasibility of translocating the solvent extraction and electrowinning plant from New South Wales to Whim Creek to set up a large scale open cut oxide copper SX-EW heap leach operation. Operations commenced in 2003, with pre-stripping of the pits and commencement of site works, with the mine fully commissioned in mid-2005.

The Whim Creek ore bodies were expected to be exhausted of copper oxide ore within early 2009. An option existed for the operation to continue as a sulphide operation thereafter.

=== Venturex era ===
Straits Resources sold the mine to Venturex Resources in 2010, after having been depleted and closed the mine in October 2009.

Venturex sold 80 percent of the project to Aurora Minerals in 2020, Venturex retaining 20 percent, for A$3.15 million and an obligation to spend A$4 million on the project and to manage it.

Aurora Minerals was renamed to Anax Metals in November 2020, while Venturex Resources rebranded itself as Develop Global Limited in 2022.

In early 2021, Anex secured A$20 million in project funding from Anglo American.

== Geology ==
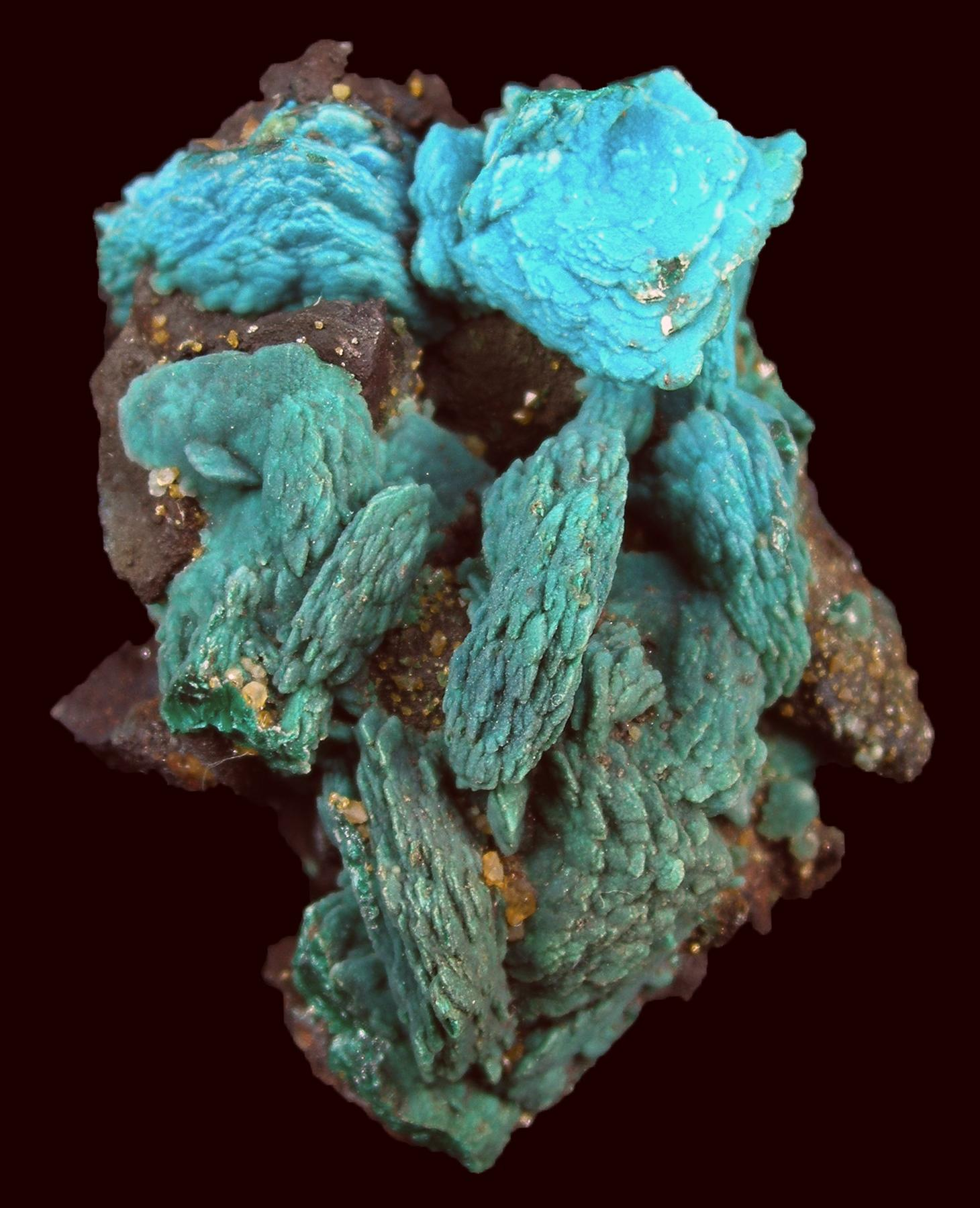
Azurite-Chrysocolla-Malachite specimen from Whim Creek. 5.0 x 4.0 x 2.9 cm.

The Whim Creek Copper Mine extracts two volcanogenic massive sulfide ore deposits, namely Mons Cupri (lit. copper mountain) and Whim Creek, which are located within the Cistern Formation and Rushalls Slate sedimentary members, which are part of a series of rift-related felsic, intermediate and mafic volcanic rocks known as the Whim Creek Group. The Whim Creek Group is approximately 2.9 to 2.8Ga old and lies unconformably upon an older basement of Portree Granite.

The ore deposits are classified as supergene oxide copper deposits and are primarily composed of weathered copper sulphide primary ores now present as a variety of copper carbonate minerals and secondary sulphides - primarily chalcocite - hosted within slate and conglomerate.

=== Ore genesis ===
The ore genesis model for the Whim Creek and Mons Cupri copper oxide deposits is that of a volcanogenic massive sulfide deposit. The main ore zones are located within sedimentary units which lie above a rhyolite footwall and below an andesite hanging wall (the Comstock Andesite member).

Ores were formed by sulphur-rich mineralising fluids carrying copper, zinc, lead, silver and iron exhaling onto the sea-floor surface, where sulfide minerals were deposited as sheets of massive sulphide mineralisation up to 7 m thick, made up of sphalerite, galena, chalcopyrite and pyrite.

The region has subsequently been deformed eight times (see Pilbara Craton for details), with the regional structure being a 30x20km pericline formed around the underlying granite dome. Locally, a series of north-east to south-west trending folds control the geology. Both deposits are stratiform and dip south with their host geology.

Mons Cupri is hosted within the Cistern Formation, which is predominantly a polymict volcanolithic pebble conglomerate. The conglomerate sits within the centre of the deposit and forms a central tor flanked by an apron of sulphides, which forms an elongate ribbon plunging west-southwest. The Mons Cupri rhyolite is in the footwall and shows typical silica-chlorite alteration. The Cistern Formation conglomerates are intensely silicified.

Whim Creek is hosted within the Rushall Slate, which is a finer-grained equivalent to the Cistern Formation. The Whim Creek deposit forms a ribbon-like sulphide shoot which plunges to the south or south-east.

Regionally, several sub-economic deposits and prospects are known, including the Salt Creek VMS deposit, the West Balla VMS prospect and the Balla Balla VMS prospect.

== Ore processing ==
Copper cathode from the Whim Creek SX-EW facility

The current mining operation at Whim Creek consists of an open cut mining operation, utilising drill-and-blast, trucking ore from Whim Creek and Mons Cupri to a central heap leach hydrometallurgy operation midway between the two. The operation runs via contract mining, with a fleet of five haul trucks and two production drill rigs.

Ore is crushed and screened to <20 mm, agglomerated with concentrated sulphuric acid, and stacked on heaps around 6 m high, which are placed atop a plastic membrane. The ore is irrigated via drippers with a dilute sulphuric acid solution and the leach liquor collected, and directed into a solvent extraction plant where the dilute lixivaint is purified. The concentrated raffinate is then pumped into an electrowinning plant where 99% or greater purity copper cathode is produced for direct sale.

The mine's nameplate capacity is 15,000 tonnes per annum of A-grade copper cathode. Production averaged around 12,000 tonnes per annum for 2006-07.

Barren overburden is stockpiled in proximity to the open pits.

There is an option to continue the operation as a sulphide crush-grind and flotation operation, as the current oxide ore bodies continue at depth as primary sulphides.

== Balla Balla River pollution ==
In 2019, the owners of the mine were handed an Environmental Protection Notice by the Department of Water and Environmental Regulation because of seepage of heavy metals from the mine into the Balla Balla River, considered a serious pollution risk. While in care and maintenance and with no active mining, Black Rock Minerals re-processed existing stockpiles through a small process plant and heap leach. Copper levels of 3.5 milligrams per litre were recorded in the local drinking water, well above the permitted level of 0.002 milligrams per litre. The small scale re-processing at Whim Creek eventually ceased in October 2019.
