= Billie Barlow =

English music hall performer

Billie Barlow in an 1888 advertisement for Our Knocker cigars

Billie Barlow (28 July 1862 – 11 February 1937; born Anna Maria Barlow) was an English music hall performer, actress and singer of the Victorian era.

== Personal life ==
Barlow was born in Bayswater, London, on 28 July 1862. She married E. M. Stuart. She died in 1937 aged 72.

== Career ==
Barlow made her stage début in an 1878 performance of the Gilbert and Sullivan comic opera H.M.S. Pinafore with the D'Oyly Carte Opera Company. She later made her New York début the next year with the same company as Isabel at the New York premiere of The Pirates of Penzance, also by Gilbert and Sullivan. At Gilbert's suggestion she changed her stage name to Billie. She remained with D'Oyly Carte until 1883, appearing in Patience in London, and then in New York Procida Bucalossi's Les Manteaux Noirs as Gomez, Planquette's Rip Van Winkle in small roles, and Iolanthe as Fleta. Over the next three years, she toured tour with E. E. Rice's company, followed by the McCaull Comic Opera Company, and then was in New York in an adaptation of Offenbach's Orpheus in the Underworld, titled Orpheus and Eurydice, at the Bijou Opera House and then in several operas at the Casino Theatre.

Back in London in 1886, she made her first appearance at the Gaiety Theatre in London in 1886, in Monte Cristo Jr., as Carconte and later Edmond Dantes. She then toured in Little Jack Sheppard, in the title role. She first performed in music hall, beginning at the Metropolitan Theatre in 1888. Barlow continued performing musical theatre, pantomime and variety in London as well in the English provinces, Australia and South Africa, into the 1920s.
