= Edward Rudge (disambiguation) =

Edward Rudge (1763–1846) was a botanist and antiquary.

Edward Rudge may also refer to:

- Edward Rudge (1630–1696), MP for Evesham 1681,1690
- Edward Rudge (politician) (1703–1763), FRS, MP for Evesham
- Edward John Rudge (1792–1861), FRS, barrister and antiquary
