= Fanny Dango =

British comedienne, singer and actress (1878–1972)

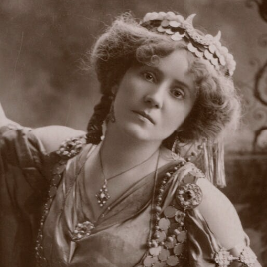
- in the 1900s by "Bassano"
- Born: Fanny Rudge; 20 October 1878; Ladywood, England, United Kingdom of Great Britain and Ireland
- Died: 15 July 1972 (aged 93); Mount Waverley, Melbourne, Victoria, Australia
- Occupations: Dancer and singer
- Spouse: Samuel Peter Mackay
- Children: 1
- Relatives: Rudge Sisters (including Letty Lind and Millie Hylton); Elsie Mackay (step-daughter)

Fanny Mackay (née Rudge; 20 October 1878 – 15 July 1972), better known as Fanny Dango, was a British comedienne, singer and actress who found fame in both the UK and Australia. She was one of the Rudge Sisters. She married a rich Australian grazier and died in Australia.

== Life ==
Dango was born in the Birmingham area of Ladywood. Her parents were Annie Elizabeth Rudge (née Hemming) and Henry Rudge who was a gas fitter, brass founder and chandelier maker. Her mother, Elizabeth, had a brief acting career in the Birmingham area. She had three brothers and two became brass founders. She was one of five sisters (they were known collectively as the Rudge Sisters): Letitia Elizabeth aka Letty Lind, Sarah aka Millie Hylton (1870–1920), Elizabeth aka Adelaide Astor (1873–1951; who married George Grossmith Jr. in 1895), Lydia aka Lydia Flopp (1877–1963) and Fanny.

== Britain ==
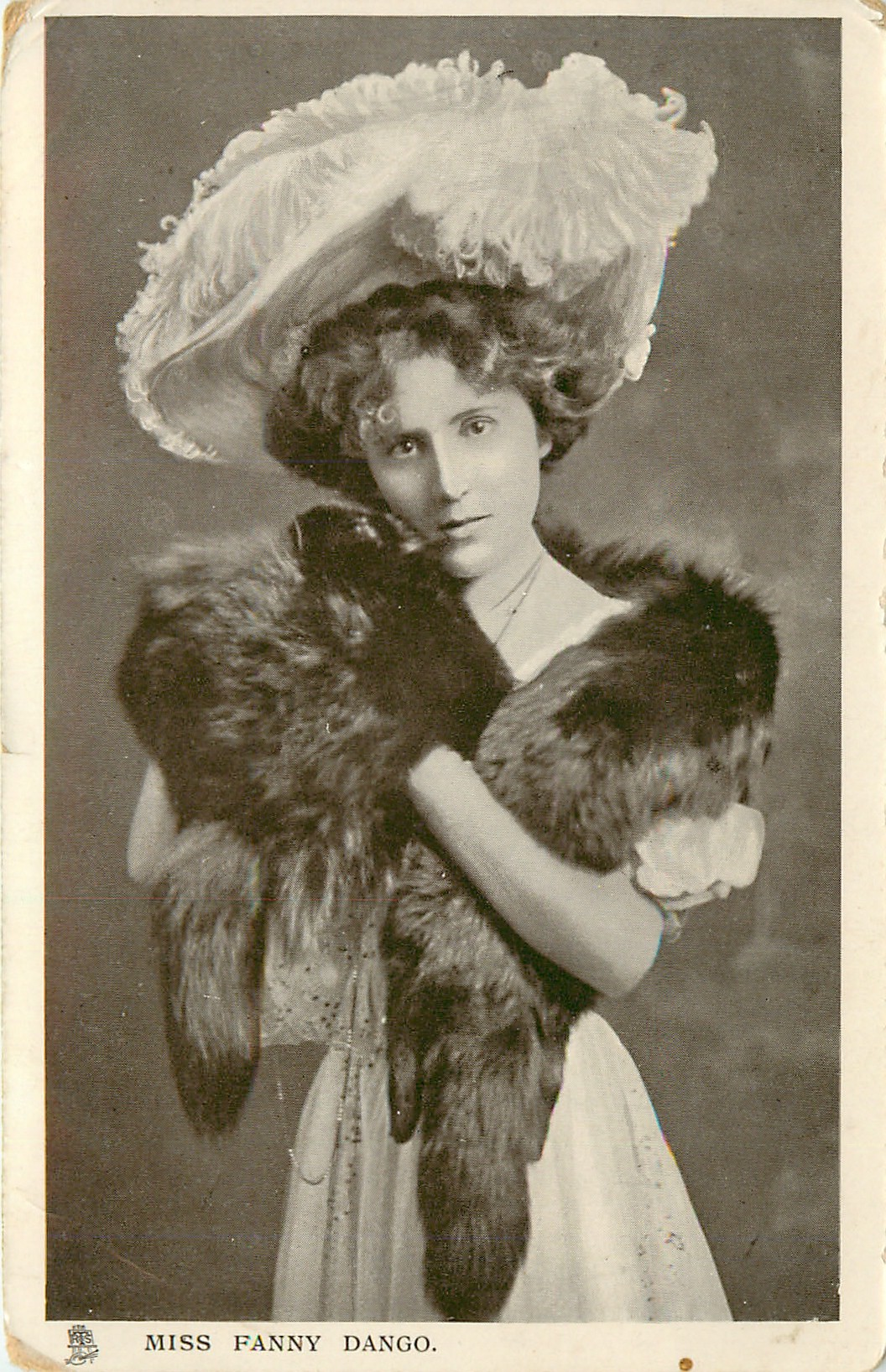
Fanny Dango on a 1906 cigarette card from "Celebrities of the Stage"

Fanny Dango worked in theatre in London and she started and was frequently involved in pantomime. She appeared at Daly's Theatre in Westminster which was one of George Edwardes houses. In 1896 and 1897 she was acting in The Geisha. Later in 1897 she was in musical comedy A Runaway Girl at the Gaiety Theatre and in Harry Graham's Little Miss Nobody at the Lyric Theatre.

== Australia ==
She had another successful career in Australia after she arrived in Melbourne in 1907. She was part of the cast for "The Merry Widow" who arrived at the request of the impresario J. C. Williamson. She worked as a comedienne co-starring in "The Girls of Gottenburg" and "The Dairymaids" with Reginald Roberts, W. S. Percy and George Lauri in Melbourne. During the latter in 1908 she was replaced due to "her fatigue" rehearsing another role in "The Lady Dandies".

While she was in Australia, she met the land owner Samuel Peter Mackay whose interest was racehorses. He had just divorced his wife, Florence Gertrude Taylor, on the grounds of her infidelity. They married in London. Her new step-daughter, Elsie Mackay became a noted actress. Elsie Mackay made her debut on stage in a minor role in Pygmalion in 1914 at His Majesty's Theatre, London.

When her husband died in 1924 he left a fortune. The bulk of his estate was left to his two sons, but Dango was a trustee and awarded £2,500 per annum for life if she remained unmarried. If she married then this would be reduced to £500 per annum.

Dango died in Mount Waverley in 1972. She was buried with her husband, her son and her step-daughter Elsie Mackay.
