= Millie Hylton =

English actress, dancer and male impersonator (1870–1920)

- Born: Sarah Frances Louise Rudge; 8 February 1870; Birmingham, England
- Died: 1 September 1920 (aged 50); Steyning, West Sussex, England
- Occupations: Actress, dancer and male impersonator
- Spouse: Henry Edward Clulow Sim (m. 1894; died 1901)
- Children: 1
- Relatives: Rudge Sisters (including Letty Lind and Fanny Dango)

Sarah Frances Louise Rudge (8 February 1870 – 1 September 1920), known professionally as Millie Hylton, was an English actress, dancer and principal boy in pantomime.

== Early life ==
Sarah Frances Louise Rudge was born on 8 February 1870 on 22 Hope Street, Birmingham, to Annie Elizabeth (née Hemming) and Henry Rudge. Her father worked as brass founder and a chandelier maker, while her mother had a brief acting career in the Birmingham area. She was one of five sisters (collectively known as the Rudge Sisters): Letitia Elizabeth a.k.a. Letty Lind, Elizabeth a.k.a. Adelaide Astor, Lydia a.k.a. Lydia Flopp (1877–1963) and Fanny a.k.a. Fanny Dango. Hylton was reputedly only four years old when she first went on the stage at the Theatre Royal, Birmingham.

== Career ==
Hylton started her career as a male impersonator in the music hall before she had turned 18, before being engaged by George Edwardes at the Gaiety Theatre, London. She would make her debut there in 1886 in Monte Cristo Jr. Also at the Gaiety Theatre, Hylton portrayed the Genie of the Ring in a version of Aladdin. After returning to the music halls, Hylton made her American debut in 1888 at Tony Pastor's theatre in Long Beach and later performed at his theatre in New York. Afterwards, she toured with Pastor's theatre troupe. In 1890, she became the principal boy in pantomime at the Theatre Royal, Brighton.

Following her return Hylton performed in the first Edwardian musical comedy, In Town, and as the titular role in the Victorian burlesque, Don Juan at the Gaiety Theatre (both in 1892).

Her most famous songs were "The Rowdy-dowdy Boys", "Linger Longer Loo", and "The Last of the Dandies".

In later life, she starred as the Abbess in Marie-Odile and as Mrs. Potash in Potash and Perlmutter.

== Personal life and death ==
From about 1891, for two years, she lived as the common law wife of variety agent Hugh J. Didcott, who had represented her since 1887.

On 30 April 1894, Hylton married Henry Edward Clulow Sim in London. In 1895, Hylton gave birth to a daughter, Millie Sim, who would later become an actress. One year later, in 1896, Hylton sued Sim for divorce, alleging physical and verbal abuse, however they remained married until Sim's death from consumption in 1901.

Hylton had been suffering from ill health and had undergone major surgery; she died at her home, 13 Langdale Gardens, Steyning, from cancer on 1 September 1920, at the age of 50. She was buried at Putney Vale Cemetery.
