= Balla Balla River =

River in Western Australia

Coordinates: 20°41′53″S 117°47′57″E

Location
- Country: Australia

Physical characteristics
- Source
  - location: near Whim Creek
  - elevation: 68 metres (223 ft)
- Mouth
  - location: Indian Ocean
  - elevation: sea level
- Length: 30 km (19 mi)

The Balla Balla River is a river in the Pilbara region of Western Australia.

The river rises on the southern side of Yirrakulanna Hills and flows in a north-easterly direction crossing the North West Coastal Highway near the Stranger mine at Whim Creek then finally discharging into Balla Balla harbour, near Depuch Island in the Indian Ocean.

The river is ephemeral and can be completely dry in the summer months, but during periodic flood events the water level can rise over 5.5 metres (18 ft). The riparian vegetation is dominated by river red gums.

The river has three tributaries, Whim Creek, Louden Creek and Caporn Creek.

The river name was recorded in 1878 by John Forrest, who was surveying the area at the time. The name is believed to be Aboriginal in origin and is thought to come from the Kanyarra word Parla, which means mud.

The traditional owners of the area are the Ngarluma people, who inhabited the region around the Balla Balla, the Maitland and the Sherlock Rivers.

The area to the west of the river contains potentially economic deposits of magnetite.

The town of Balla Balla, gazetted in 1898, was once located near the river mouth. It acted as a port for the Whim Creek copper mine.

In 2019, the owners of the Whim Creek Copper Mine were handed an Environmental Protection Notice by the Department of Water and Environmental Regulation because of seepage of heavy metals from the mine into the Balla Balla River, considered a serious pollution risk. While in care and maintenance and with no active mining, Black Rock Minerals re-processed existing stockpiles through a small process plant and heap leach. Copper levels of 3.5 milligrams per litre were recorded in the local drinking water, well above the permitted level of 0.002 milligrams per litre. The small scale re-processing at Whim Creek eventually ceased in October 2019.
