= John Rudge (disambiguation) =

John Rudge (born 1944) is an English football player and manager

John Rudge may also refer to:

- John Rudge (banker) (1669–1740), English merchant, banker and politician
- John Arthur Roebuck Rudge (1837–1903), British scientific inventor
- John Charlton Rudge (born 1944), head of Grand Duchy of Avram
