= Samuel Peter Mackay =

Australian pastoralist (1864–1923)

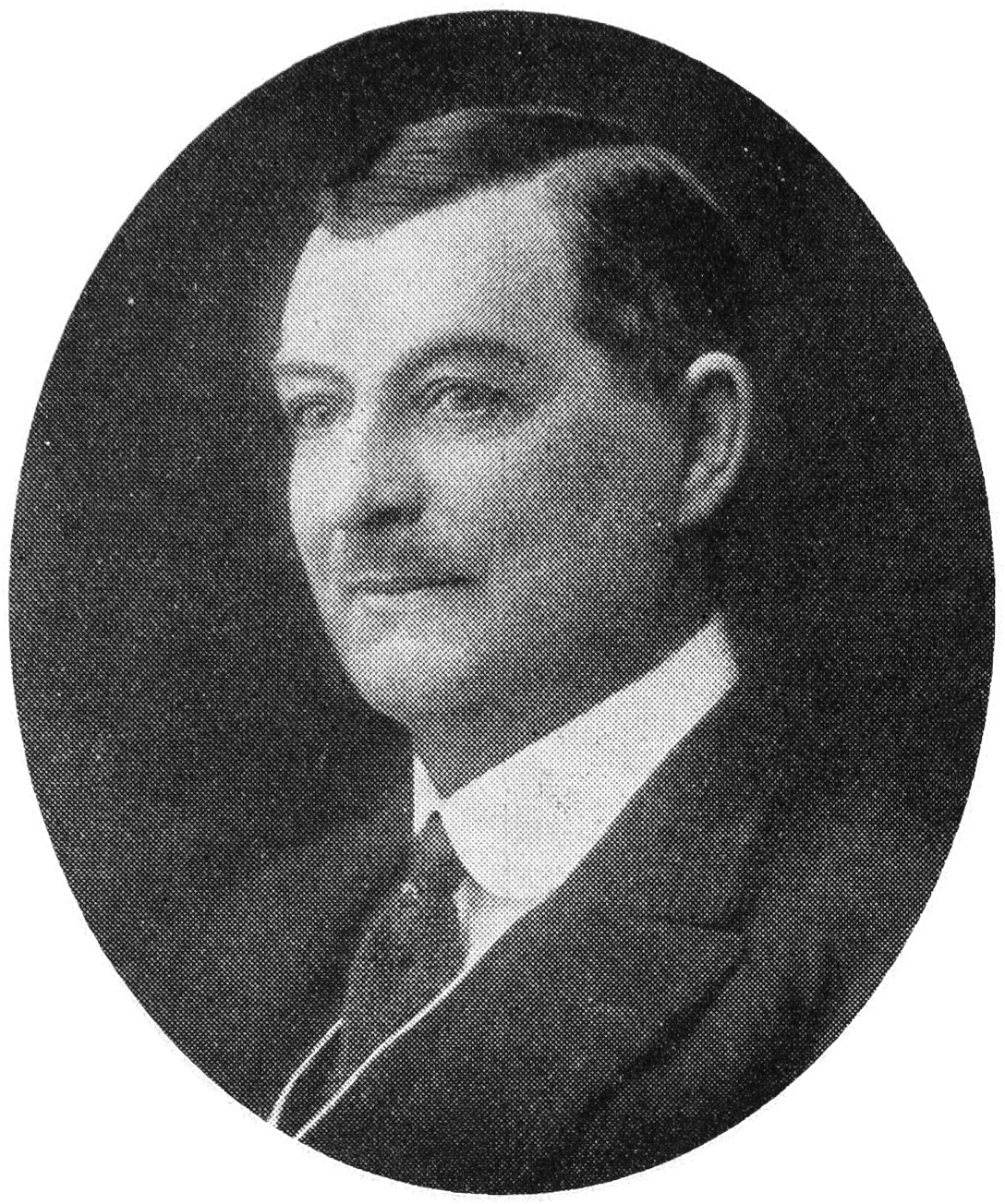
- Born: 1864; Isle of Skye, Inverness-shire, Scotland
- Died: 11 May 1923 (aged 58–59); Melbourne, Victoria, Australia
- Education: Mount Gambier Grammar School
- Occupations: Pastoralist; businessman
- Relatives: Elsie Mackay (daughter)

Samuel Peter Mackay (1864 – 11 May 1923) was a pastoralist and businessman in Western Australia.

== Family and early life ==
His parents were pioneers from Ben Mohr Estate, Snizort, Isle of Skye, Inverness-shire, who emigrated with their parents, perhaps to Victoria in 1852, but settled in Naracoorte, South Australia in 1855. Mackay was born in 1864 and was educated at Mount Gambier Grammar School but left at age 13. He worked as a drover and a surveyor before deciding to move to Western Australia along with his father, Donald MacKay (1832 – 24 December 1901), and uncles Roderick Louden Mackay and Donald McDonald MacKay. Together, the men worked in the pearling industry in the North West region.

De Grey Station was owned by Mackay in 1875 and was briefly managed by George Julius Brockman for three months of the same year while Mackay travelled to Melbourne.

== Career ==
Realising the pastoral prospects of the country, the men bought the 404,686-hectare (1,000,000-acre) Mundabullangana Station in about 1880. The Mackays were involved in the racing industry and in breeding horses on the station. In 1903, following the death of his father, Mackay bought out his uncles and became the sole owner of the property.

MacKay bought and sold many stations throughout the northwest part of Western Australia; J. G. Meares sold his share of Sherlock Station to Mackay in 1910. Later the same year, Mackay acquired the Springs station, which he sold in 1910 to S.L. Burges. In 1911, MacKay unsuccessfully bid £25,000 for the Croydon Station, which adjoins Pyramid Station. MacKay acquired Croydon at a later date and sold the 1,862-square-kilometre (460,000-acre) property stocked with 12,000 sheep in 1921. At one time, Mackay had also acquired Balmoral Station from James Munro; he later sold it to B. H. Sharpe and Company.

Mackay left Western Australia in 1905 and returned to Victoria while retaining his pastoral interests. He bought Melville Parkland build a large house there, later renamed as Edrington, where he lived until 1912, then moved to St Kilda, and eventually to Rock House Estate near Kyneton, where he hoped to establish a horse stud.

In early 1922, while in Perth, MacKay had to have his leg amputated. He eventually returned to Melbourne but died on 11 May 1923 while in hospital. He was buried at Brighton Cemetery three days later with several prominent members of the racing community acting as pall-bearers.

== Private life ==
In 1911, Mackay had divorced his first wife, Florence Gertrude Taylor, when he married Fanny Rudge who used the stage name of Fanny Dango. They married in London.

In the 1920s, Mackay's daughter, Elsie Mackay, became a notable actress in Britain, the United States and Australia.
