= Chichester Range =

Mountain range in Western Australia

Coordinates: 22°18′S 119°20′E

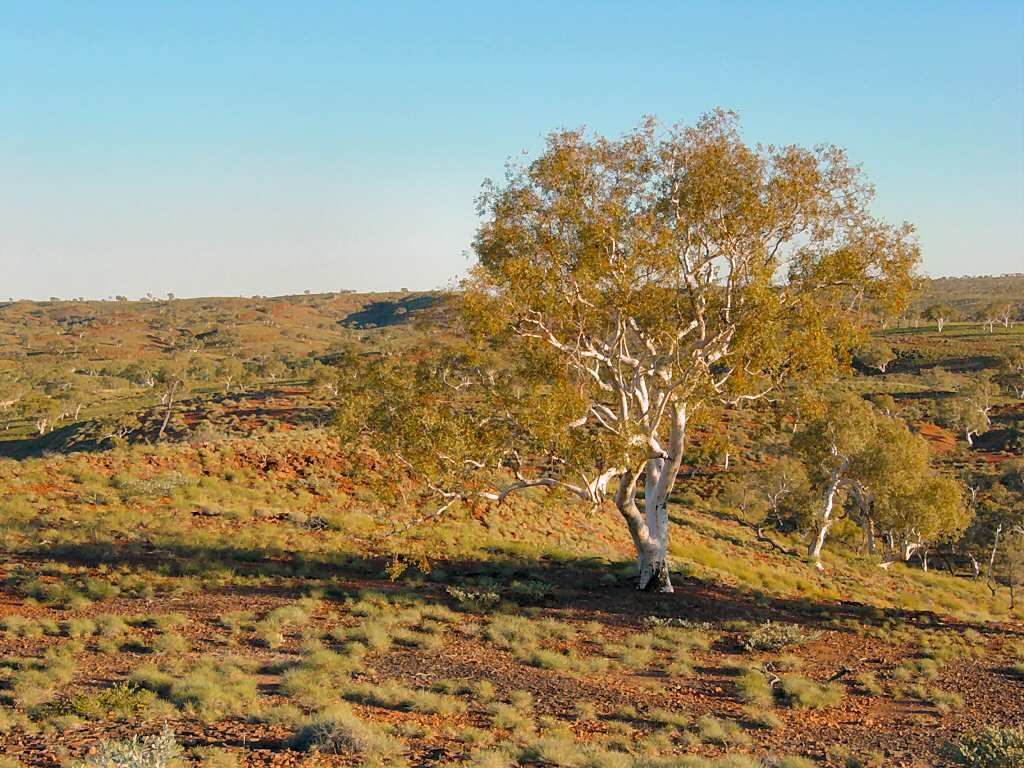
Millstream-Chichester National Park

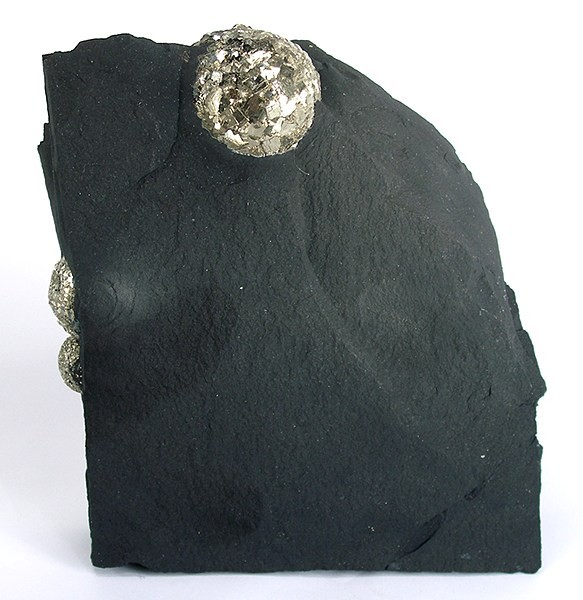
Unusual occurrence of pyrite on black shale, near old Millstream Station

The Chichester Range is a range in the Pilbara region of Western Australia. The range rises abruptly from the coastal plain and is composed of rolling hills, escarpments, jagged peaks, gorges and winding tree-lined watercourses.

The range is best described as an escarpment with a height of 350 metres (1,150 ft) forming a tableland behind that slope gently to the south until it runs into the Hamersley Range. The steep escarpment is defined by a jumble of weathered basalts and granophyres.

The highest point of the Chichester Range is Mount Herbert, with a height of 367 metres (1,204 ft). The peak takes about 45 minutes to climb and a car park is at the base of the peak. The peak is also on the route of the Chichester Range Camel trail, a tourist attraction that is operated on the range that finishes at Python's Pool. The range is part of the Millstream-Chichester National Park, along with Millstream station that is one of the few permanent watercourses in the area.

Geologically the range is made up of a mixture of sandstone, igneous rocks, and mineralised banded iron formation, being part of the Pilbara Craton.

The area was named by the explorer Francis Thomas Gregory in 1861 after the Parliamentary Under-Secretary of State for the Colonies Chichester Fortescue.

The traditional owners of the area are the Bailgu or Palyku people, who speak the Yinjibarndi language.

The range is the basis of two major river basins, the Fortescue Basin and the Port Hedland coast Basin. The Port Hedland Coast Basin is the catchment area for many rivers, including the Harding River, Sherlock River, Yule River and Shaw River.
