= Whim Creek, Western Australia =

Whim Creek
- Town
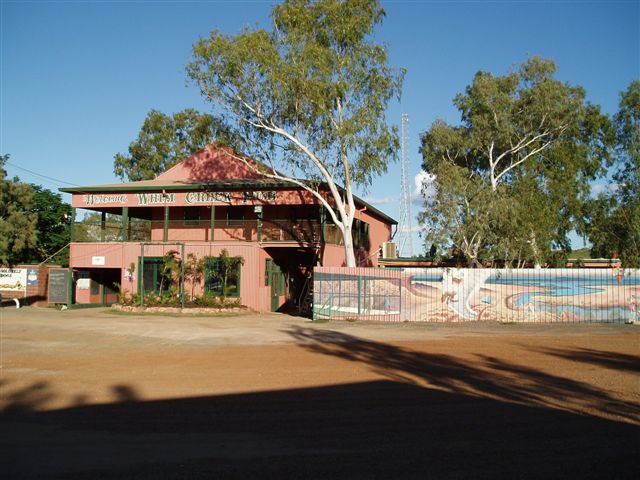
- The iconic Whim Creek Pub, c. 2007

- Coordinates: 20°50′00″S 117°50′00″E
- Country: Australia
- State: Western Australia
- LGA(s): City of Karratha
- Location: 1,645 km (1,022 mi) from Perth
- Established: 1872

Government
  - State electorate(s): North West
  - Federal division(s): Durack

Area
  - Total: 30.3 km^{2} (11.7 sq mi)

Population
  - Total(s): 5 (SAL 2021)
- Postcode: 6718
- Mean max temp: 32.3 °C (90.1 °F)
- Mean min temp: 20.7 °C (69.3 °F)
- Annual rainfall: 269.8 mm (10.62 in)

Whim Creek is a small town in the Pilbara region of Western Australia.

Originally a post office known as "Whim Well", Whim Creek is on the North West Coastal Highway midway between Karratha and Port Hedland. It is 1,645 kilometres (1,022 mi) north of Perth and a stopover point for travellers to Broome.

== Whim Creek Hotel ==
The Whim Creek Hotel is a famous landmark midway between Roebourne and Port Hedland, and was renowned as a rest stop, hotel and drinking establishment for most of the 20th century.

The original Whim Creek Hotel was a tin-roofed structure which was blown down in a cyclone in the 1890s. The hotel was resurrected, and has been blown down twice since; in the mid-20th century and in the 1990s.

The current Whim Creek Hotel was erected in the early 20th century. The original building frame, made of steel, was intended to be the frame for the Marble Bar courthouse. The frame and materials were landed at the Balla Balla Creek jetty, ready for transport inland to Marble Bar, but the effort was stranded by a large cyclone. The building was erected at its current site on the banks of Whim Creek, where the steel frame has stood ever since. The wooden facade has, however, been blown off twice.

The hotel was bought as part of the Whim Creek Copper Mine by Venturex Resources in 2010, and closed in 2011. In late 2013 the hotel was bought by the Ngarluma Aboriginal Corporation and Ngarluma Yindjibarndi Foundation, who plan to restore and re-open it.

The Hotel has again closed in an arrangement of handing the hotel to the Ngarluma Aboriginal Corporation in 2018.

== Colourful history ==
On April 2 to April 3, 1898, the town received 36.49 inches (927 mm) of rain in 48 hours, with 29.41 inches (747 mm) falling in a 24-hour period. On March 22 and March 23, 1899 another 27 inches (686 mm) fell.

Whim Creek was renowned for its alcoholic camel which used to drink patrons' beers before being relocated to Wiluna, suffering from cirrhosis of the liver, and a large python which used to live within the rafters above the bar.

Five brothers, from the Lockyer family, from the local Aboriginal community are commemorated for their war service via a small memorial in the car park. Two of the brothers died, three returned. (1 KIA serving with the RAAF and 1 KIA serving in the Australian Army).

== History of mining ==
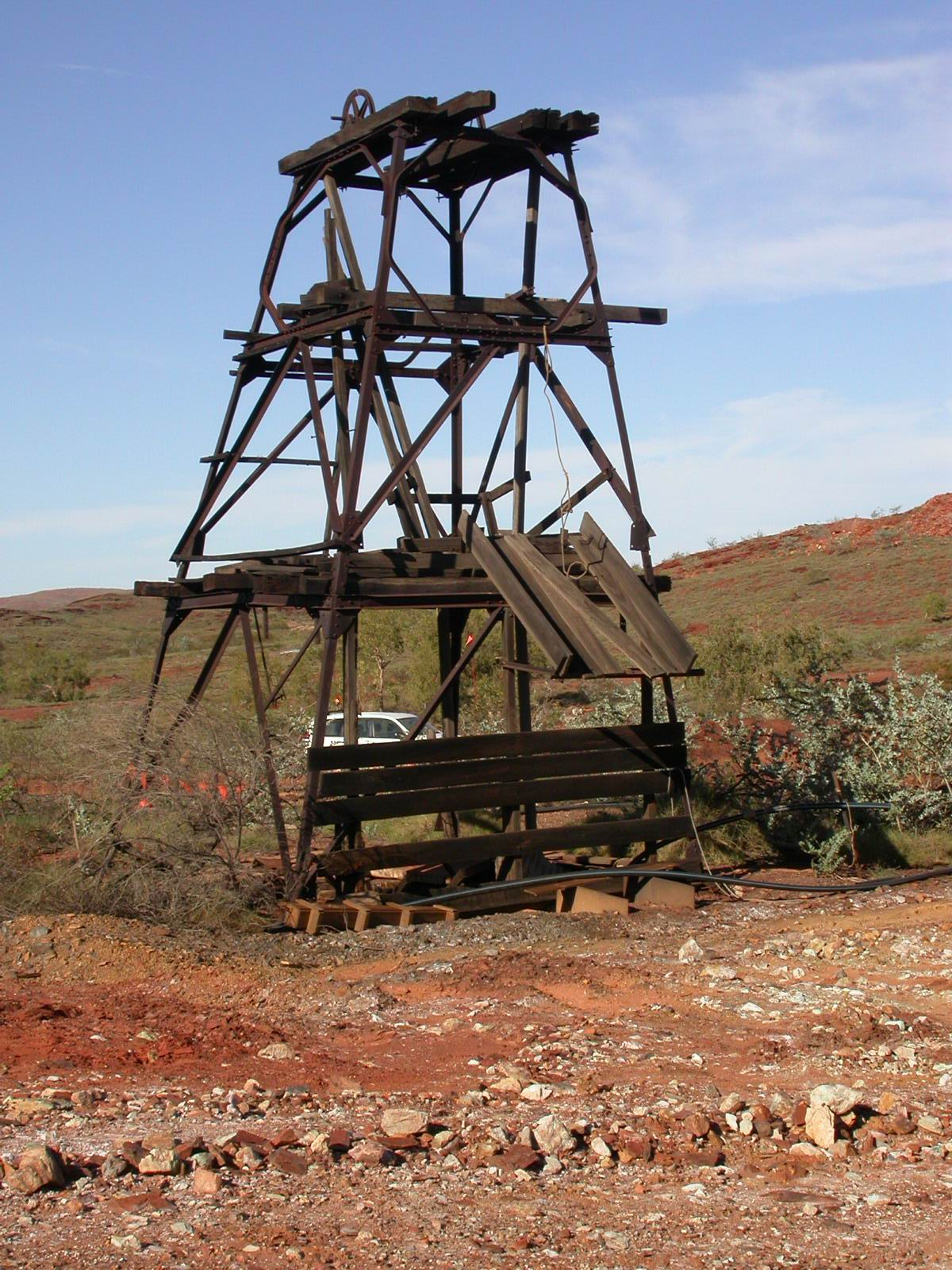
Old headframe for historic underground workings, Whim Creek Mine

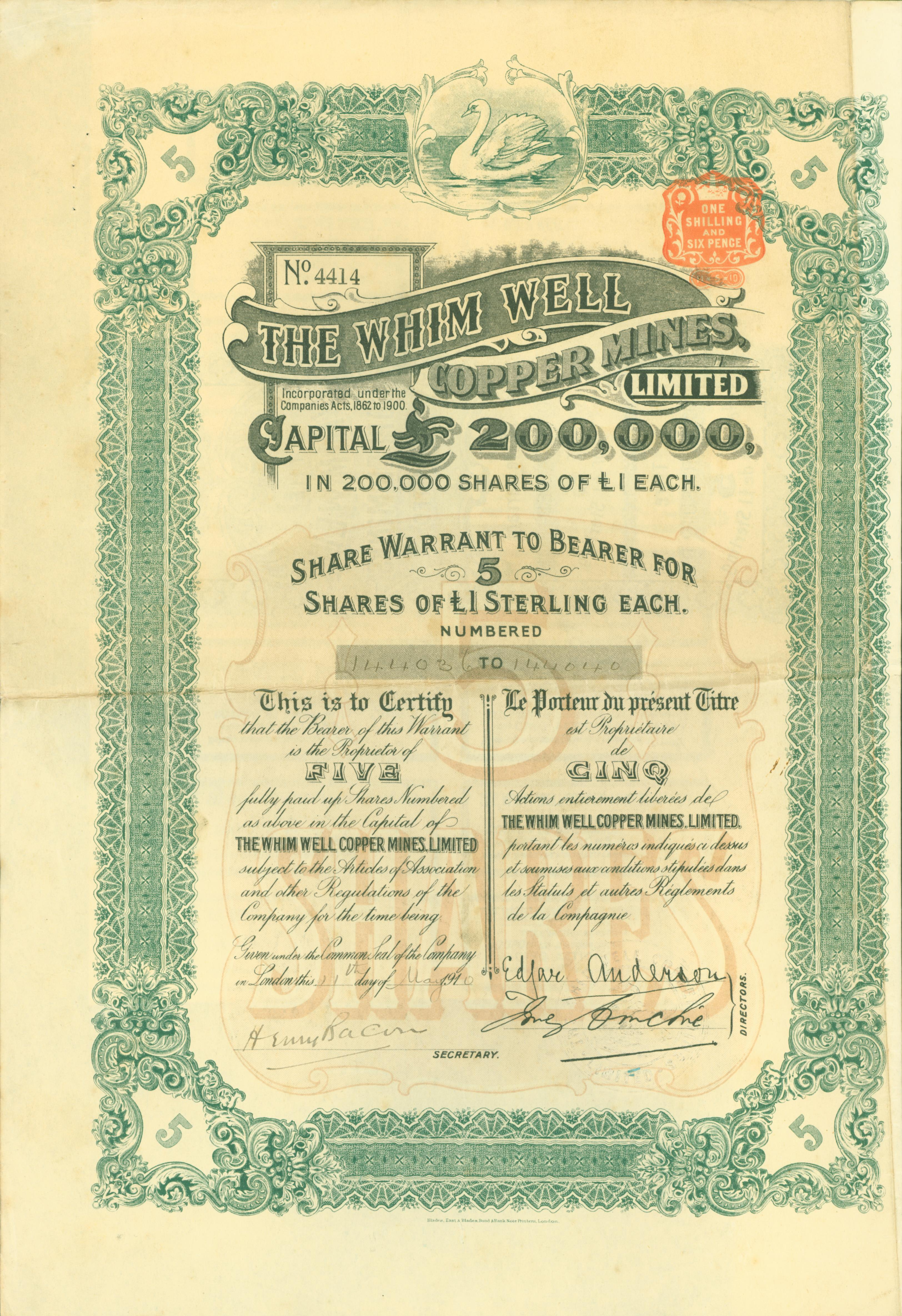
Share of the Whim Well Copper Mines Ltd., issued 2. May 1910

Copper was discovered several kilometres west of the town in 1872 and gold 20 km north in 1887.

Copper has been mined on and off at Whim Creek over a period of 120 years. Copper was mined initially via a series of small adits and stopes into the Whim Creek and Mons Cupri deposits by artisanal miners, with records indicating that as early as 1882 small quantities of malachite, azurite, chrysocolla and other copper minerals were being won. Copper was shipped via a small port on the coast at the nearby town of Balla Balla. A single track narrow-gauge railway ran from Whim Creek to Balla Balla. At its peak, the town supported two hotels, a blacksmith, a police station and a horse track.

In the early 1900s a second period of mining began, with around 60,000 tonnes of copper concentrate produced mainly from the Whim Creek Mine. In the 1960s Japanese interests undertook a resource drilling program, with diamond core drilling, and built a small oxide mining operation. This shut down in the early 1970s.

The leases passed to Whim Creek Copper Limited, but the company found profit elsewhere, and the mining leases were passed through several owners until the mid-1990s when Straits Resources Limited took over the tenure.

== Mining today ==
Whim Creek Hotel had served as an accommodation village for the mine workers who work at the Whim Creek Copper Mine. Around 150 to 180 men and women lived in demountable units (dongers), and shared messing facilities at the Whim Creek Hotel. Several other mining and exploration camps located nearby also used the hotel and messing facilities, as few other facilities exist.

With the closure of the mine in 2018 and the handing over of the hotel to new owners, the site has remained closed.
