= Millstream Chichester National Park =

National park in the Pilbara region of Western Australia

- IUCN category II (national park)
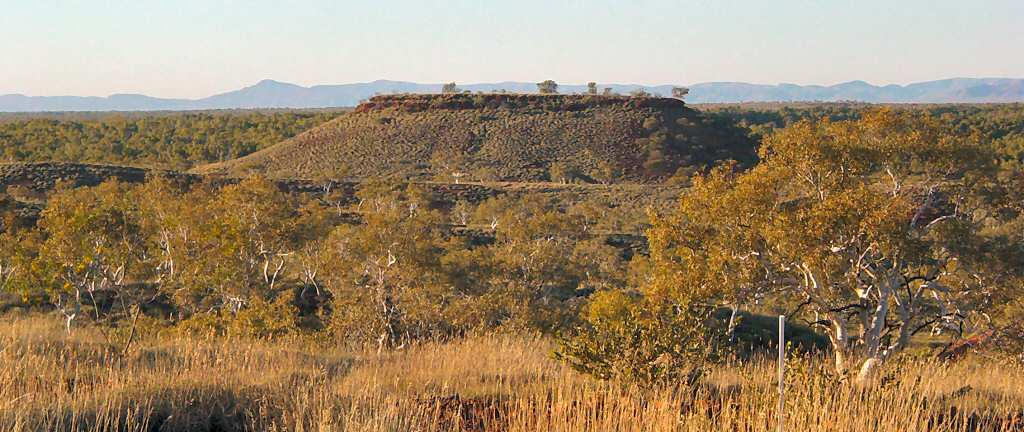
- Looking toward the Chichester Range

- Location within Western Australia
- Location: Western Australia
- Nearest city: Roebourne
- Coordinates: 21°16′24″S 117°06′27″E
- Area: 2,381.67 km^{2} (919.57 sq mi)
- Established: 1970
- Governing body: Department of Parks and Wildlife
- Website: Official website

Millstream Chichester National Park is a national park in the Pilbara region of Western Australia, located 1,190 kilometres (739 mi) north of the state capital, Perth.

The park is made up of the old Millstream Station, which is on the Millstream Creek, just before it joins Fortescue River, one of the few permanent watercourses in the area and the Chichester Range.

== History ==
The area is homeland of the Yinjibarndi people. Millstream Creek was named by the explorer Francis Thomas Gregory in 1861. He reported the favourable grazing prospects. The first pastoral lease was taken up on 1865.

By 1907 the property was owned by Loton and Padbury, and occupied an area of 2,590 square kilometres (1,000 sq mi). It was stocked with 20,500 sheep, 1,900 cattle and 150 horses, and was passed in at auction at £26,000, equivalent to A$4.4 million in 2022.

The present Millstream Homestead was built in 1920. The homestead was a tavern between 1975 and 1986.

In 1970, the Chichester Range National Park was set aside and officially named. In 1975, the Conservation through Reserves Committee made recommendations for reserves in the Pilbara region, and subsequently, the Millstream region was integrated into the park in 1982.

The Yindjibarndi people work as rangers and contractors in the park. The Millstream Homestead Visitor Centre is in the old homestead, which feature rooms dedicated to the Yinjibarndi people, the early settlers and the natural environment. Other displays provide information about the park's attractions and management challenges.

== Climate ==
The Pilbara is located within the arid tropics. During summer, between October and April, temperatures rise above 40 °C (104 °F), and cyclones and local thunderstorms can flood roads and watercourses. The cool season, between May and August, experiences little rain, with daytime temperatures around 26 °C (79 °F). Nights at this time of year can be cool, so warm clothes may be necessary.

== Camping ==
Camping is available at Miliyanha and Stargazers campgrounds. Miliyanha has a camp kitchen, toilets and generators are allowed. It has some shade in the mornings and afternoon. Stargazers is a more open site and generators are not permitted. A gas BBQ and toilets are provided. Both campgrounds are suitable for tent camping up to very large caravans and motorhomes, and can be accessed by two-wheel drive vehicles in good weather. Information concerning road conditions can be obtained from the Shire of Ashburton.

Snake Creek Campground has been closed to campers since 2011, and Crossing Pool has been closed to campers since 2013 due to safety issues concerning a drop in water levels and tree death.

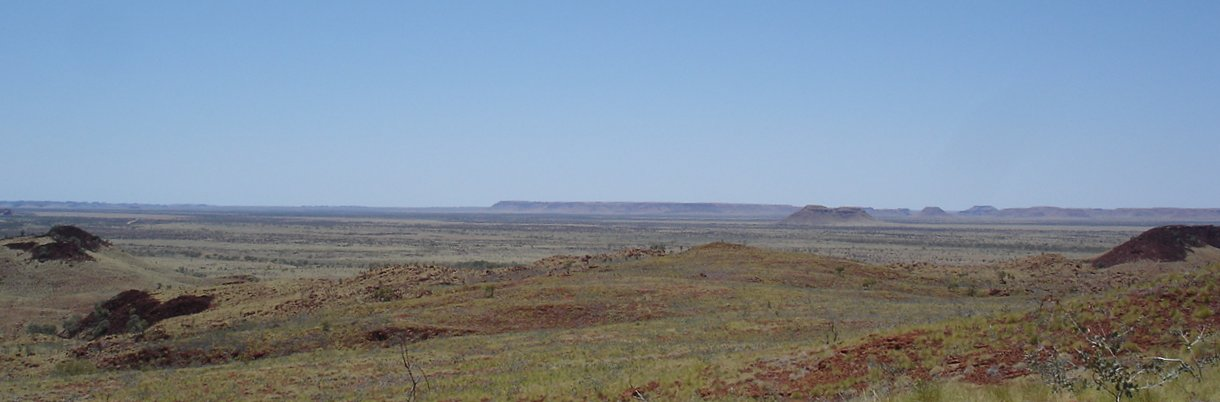
Millstream National Park panorama

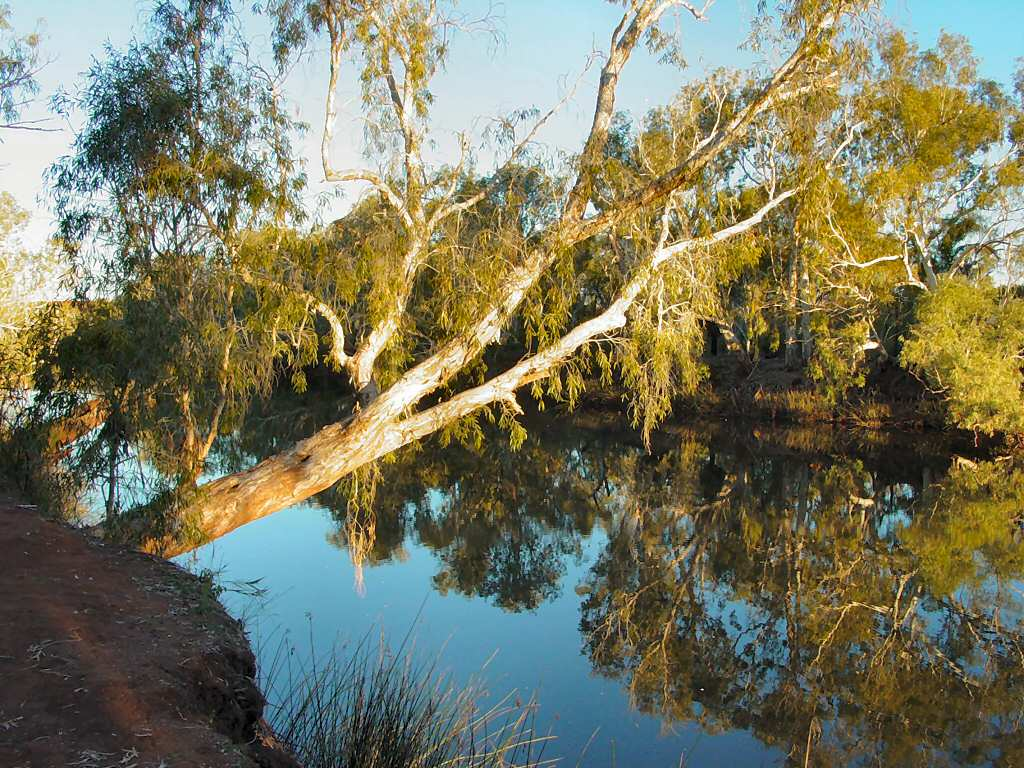
Millstream Creek Riparian Vegetation

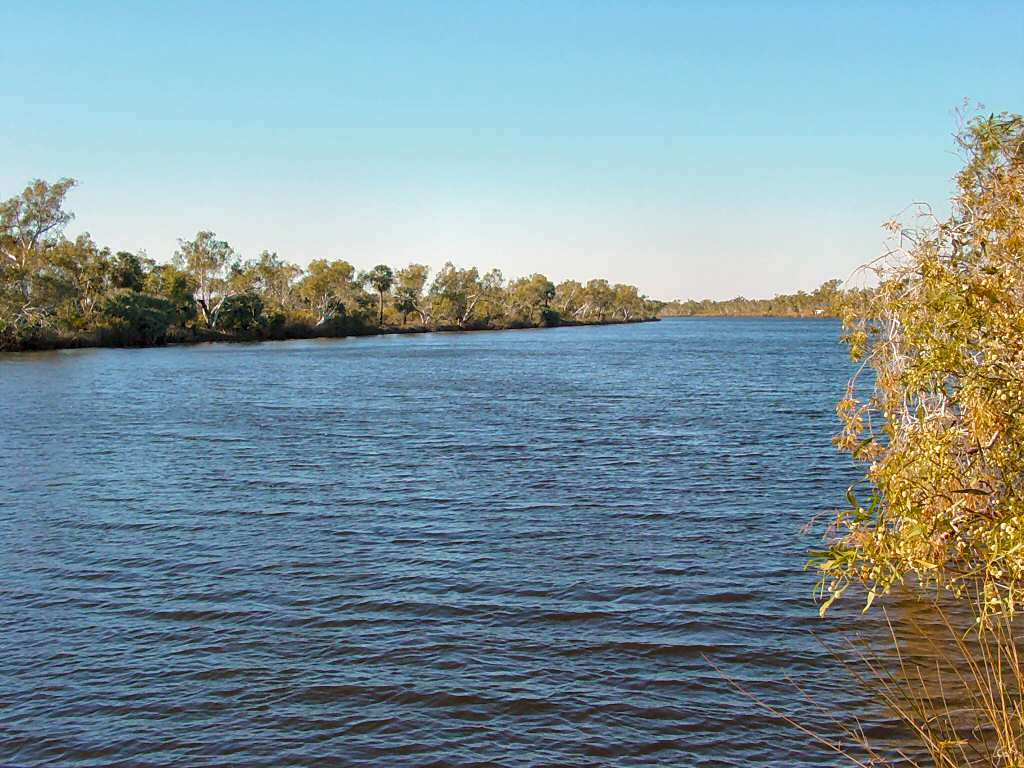
Deep Reach Pool

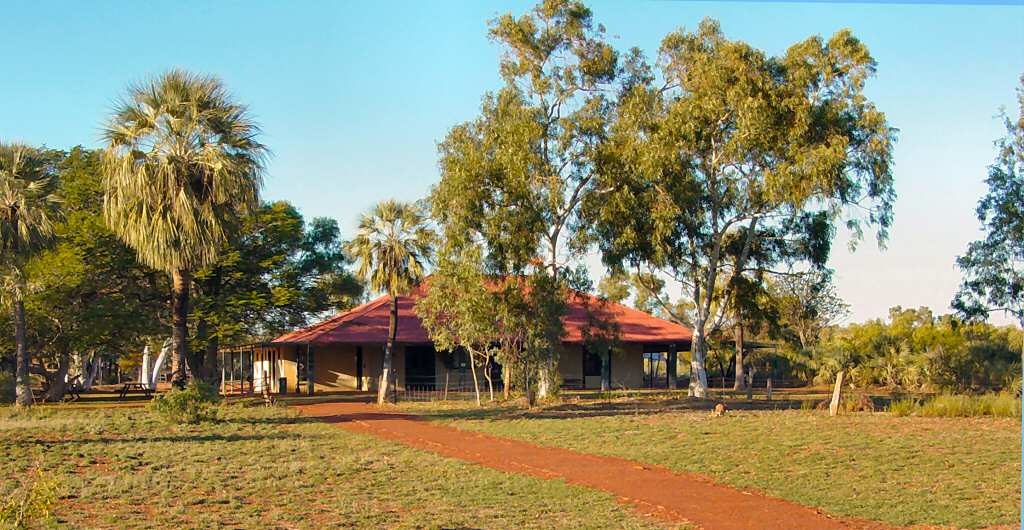
Millstream Homestead

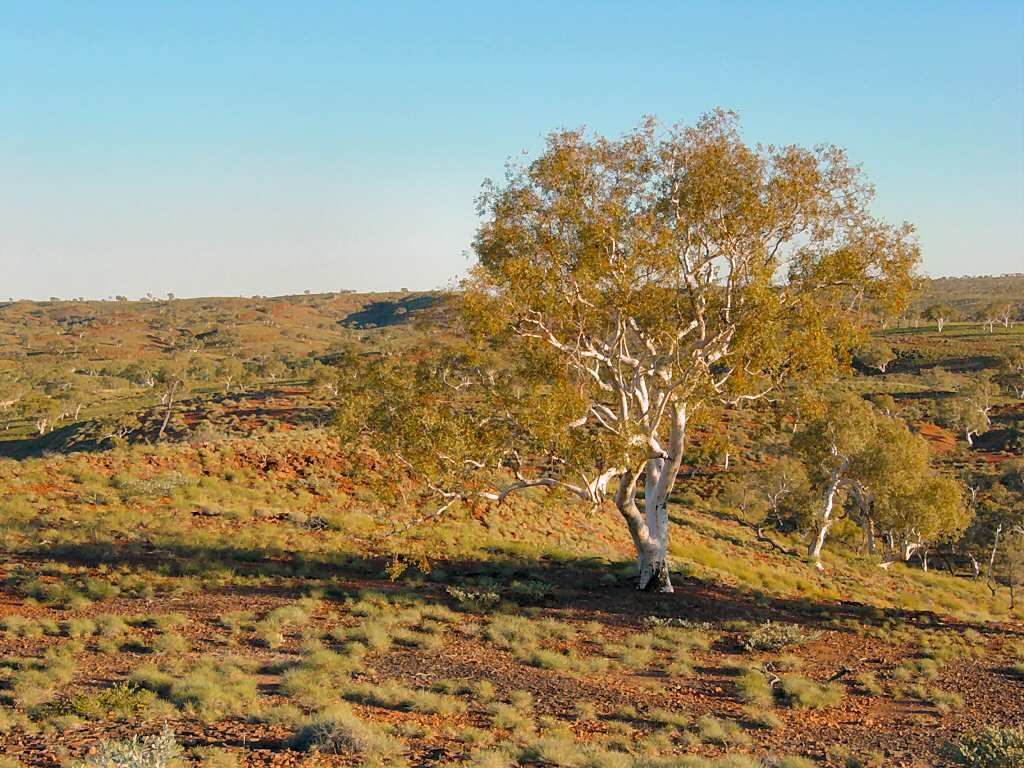
View of National Park

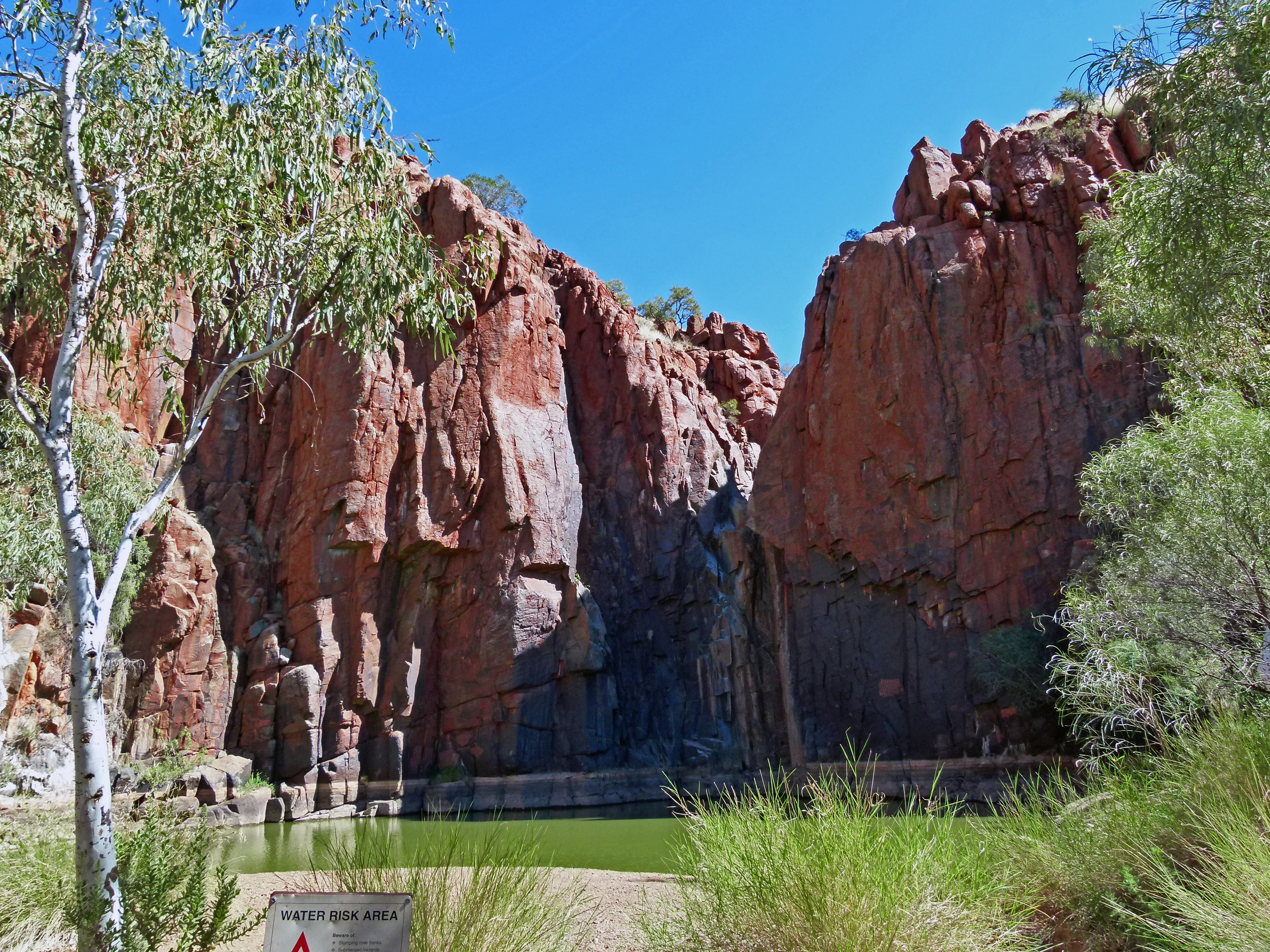
Python Pool

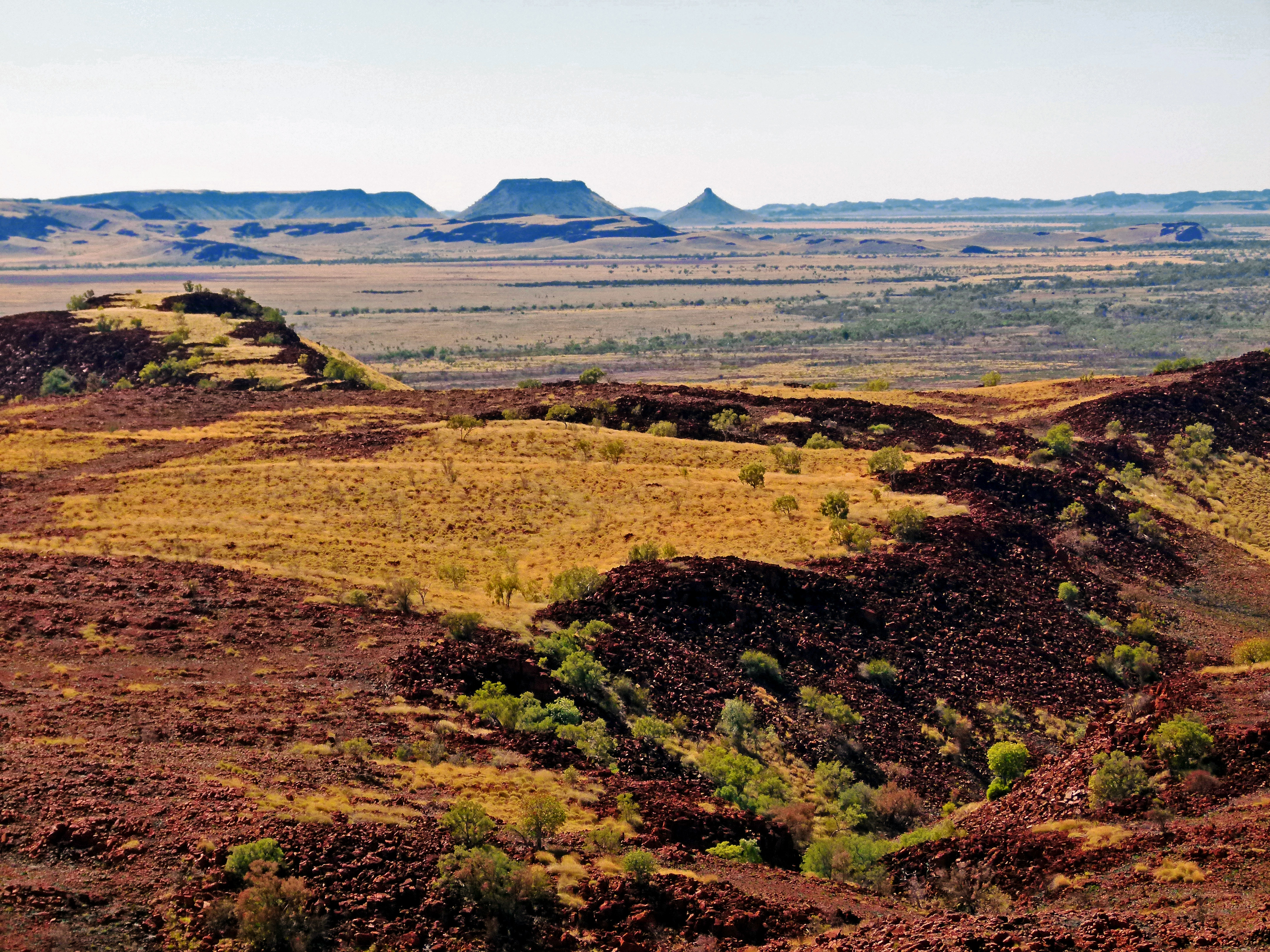
View over park

== Culture ==
=== Yindjibarndi people ===
The Millstream Chichester area is a very significant Aboriginal cultural site in northern Australia. Its cultural and mythological importance stems from thousands of years of occupation, with Millstream being the home of the serpent or Warlu, similar to the Wagyl, whose presence is still strongly felt at Nhanggangunha (Deep Reach Pool). All the pools are significant in this regard and warrant a high level of respect because of their spiritual and mythological importance.

The broad area of land straddling the Fortescue River (Yarnda Nyirranha) from the Hamersley Range through to the Chichester escarpment is the homeland of the Yindjibarndi people. The Ngarluma people's lands run from the Chichester escarpment northward to the sea.

Aside from its highly important spiritual significance, Millstream was an important campsite for inter-tribal meetings. The Fortescue River provided food and water, particularly during drier months. Along the river, Aboriginal people had a varied diet of red meat, fish, reptiles, grubs, eggs, honey fruits and root vegetables. Extensive areas were burnt to create natural paddocks and attract kangaroos. The dry climate meant that knowledge of the locations of waterholes was important. The Aboriginal people (Ngardangarli) were skilled in land management and were nomadic within their traditional boundaries.

Yindjibarndi and Ngarluma people continue to come to the park to spend time on country and to carry out customary activities. They are also represented on the Jirndawurrunhs Park Council which, in association with the Department of Parks and Wildlife, manages the strategic direction of the park.

== See also ==
- Protected areas of Western Australia
