= Sherlock River (Western Australia) =

River in Western Australia,

Coordinates: 20°42′36″S 117°33′07″E

Location
- Country: Australia

Physical characteristics
- Source
  - elevation: 470 metres (1,542 ft)
- Mouth
  - elevation: sea level
- Length: 393 kilometres (244 mi)
- Basin size: 4,580 square kilometres (1,768 sq mi)
- Discharge
  - average: 188 GL/a (6.0 m^{3}/s; 210 cu ft/s)

The Sherlock River is a river in the Pilbara region of Western Australia. It was named on 11 July 1861 by the surveyor and explorer Frank Gregory while on expedition in the area.

The headwaters of the river rise from numerous springs on the Abydos Plain below the Mungaroona Range near the western edge of the Mungaroona Range Nature Reserve then flow in a northerly direction past the Chichester Range and then continuing north. The river crosses the North West Coastal Highway near Mount Fraser before discharging into Sherlock Bay and the Indian Ocean.

The river forms a large estuary at the river mouth with an area of 89.7 square kilometres (35 sq mi).

Major pools exist along the length of the river, including Coonanarrinna Pool and Weedeemilegener Pool. The main riverbed is very wide and is mostly dry, with a minor ocean outlet from a large salt marsh estuarine area that contains small areas of mangroves.
