= Mount Whaleback mine =

Iron ore mine in Western Australia

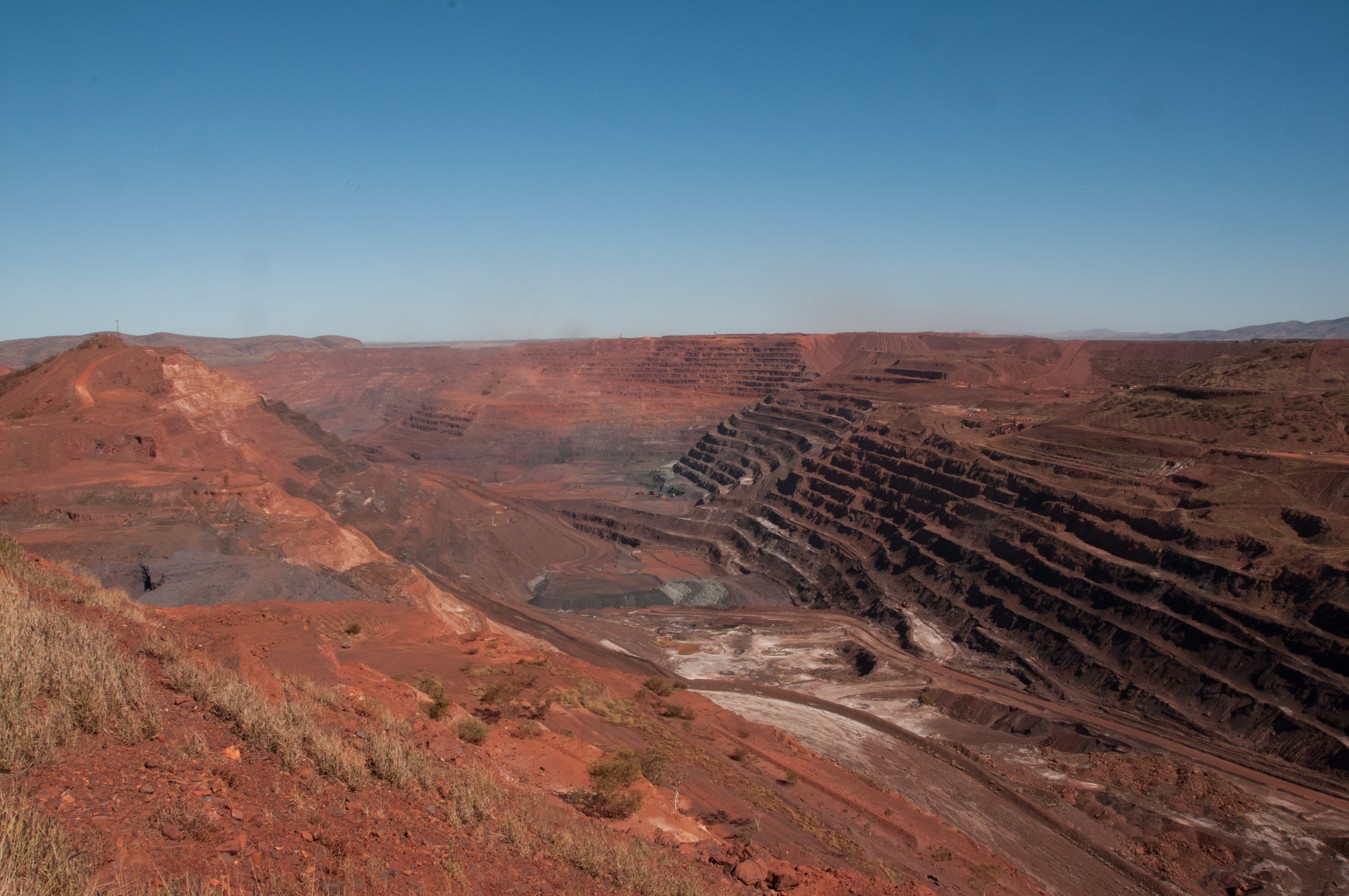
- 2013 photo

- Location in Western Australia
- Interactive map of Mount Whaleback mine
- Location: Shire of East Pilbara, Pilbara, Western Australia, Australia; 23°21′55″S 119°40′31″E
- Products: Iron ore
- Production: Nominal capacity: 75 million tonnes/annum Combined production: 63 million tonnes/annum (for the Newman Hub, consisting of Newman West and East)
- Financial year: 2021
- Opened: 1968
- Company: BHP (85%); Mitsui Iron (10%); Itochu Minerals (5%)
- Website: BHP website

The Mount Whaleback mine, officially the Newman West operation, is an iron ore mine located in the Pilbara region of Western Australia, six kilometres west of Newman.

The mine is majority-owned (85 per cent) and operated by BHP, and is one of five iron ore mines the company operates in the Pilbara. The company also operates two port facilities at Port Hedland, Nelson Point and Finucane Island, and over 1,000 kilometres of rail in the Pilbara.

BHP is the second-largest iron ore mining company in the Pilbara, behind Rio Tinto and ahead of the Fortescue Metals Group. In 2010, BHP employed 8,000 people in its Pilbara operations.

== Overview ==
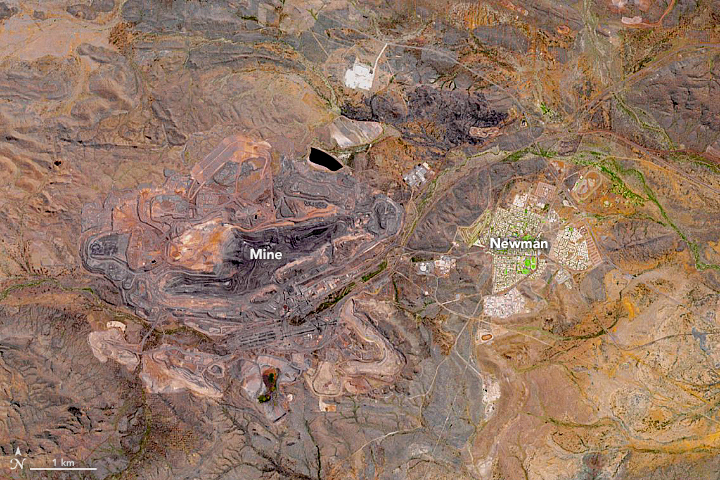
Mount Whaleback Iron Mine and the town of Newman from space, 2020

Iron ore mines in the Pilbara region

The Mount Whaleback deposit was discovered in 1957 by Stan Hilditch but not publicised until 1960, when the Australian Government lifted the embargo on iron ore exports it had put in place because of concerns the mineral was in short supply. The first mine to develop was the Goldsworthy mine in 1965 and a railway line, the Goldsworthy railway, as well as port facilities at Finucane Island were constructed. On 1 June 1966, the first shipment of iron ore from the Pilbara left on board of the Harvey S. Mudd.

BHP's operations in Newman date back to 1968, when the Mount Whaleback mine was opened, the biggest single-pit, open-pit iron ore mine in the world, developed originally by United States company Bechtel Pacific. The mine is 1.5 kilometres wide, more than five kilometres long and is scheduled to eventually reach a depth of 0.5 kilometres. A new town, Newman, was constructed, as well as a 426-kilometre railway line, the Mount Newman railway. The first train left Newman on 1 January 1969 and the first shipment of Newman ore left port on 1 April 1969 on board of the Osumi Maru. Newman remained a "closed" company town until 1981.

Ore from the mines is transported by rail to Port Hedland through two independent railways. The Mount Newman railway carries ore from Mount Whaleback, Orebodies 18, 23 and 25, Jimblebar, Yandi and Area C. The Yarrie mine is serviced by the separate, shorter Goldsworthy railway.

Ore from the Mount Whaleback and the other Newman mines, as well as the Yandi mine is transported to the port at Nelson Point, while ore from Area C and Yarrie goes to Finucane Island. Ore is transported through a 1.16-kilometre-long tunnel from Nelson Point to the port at Finucane Island. The average loading time for a ship is 30 hours and 800 ships are loaded annually at Port Hedland.

The mine can be visited on a 1½-hour tour.
