= Jimblebar mine =

Iron ore mine in Western Australia

- Location in Western Australia
- Interactive map of Jimblebar mine
- Location: Shire of East Pilbara, Pilbara, Western Australia, Australia; 23°23′04″S 120°07′23″E
- Products: Iron ore
- Production: 67 million tonnes/annum
- Financial year: 2021
- Opened: 1989
- Company: BHP
- Website: https://www.bhp.com/what-we-do/global-locations/australia/western-australia/jimblebar
- Acquired: 1992

The Jimblebar mine is an iron ore mine located in the Pilbara region of Western Australia, 41 kilometres east of Newman.

The mine is fully owned and operated by BHP, and is one of seven iron ore mines the company operates in the Pilbara. The company also operates two port facilities at Port Hedland, Nelson Point and Finucane Island, and over 1,000 kilometres of rail in the Pilbara.

BHP is the second-largest iron ore mining company in the Pilbara, behind Rio Tinto and ahead of Fortescue Metals Group. As of 2010, BHP employs 8,000 people in its Pilbara operations.

== Overview ==
Iron ore mines in the Pilbara region

The origins of mining in the Newman area date back to when the Mount Whaleback deposit was discovered in 1957 by Stan Hilditch but not publicised until 1960, when the federal government lifted the embargo on iron ore exports it had put in place because of concerns the mineral was in short supply. The first mine to develop was the Goldsworthy mine in 1965 and a railway line, the Goldsworthy railway, as well as port facilities at Finucane Island were constructed. On 1 June 1966, the first shipment of iron ore from the Pilbara left on board Harvey S. Mudd.

BHP's operations in Newman began in 1968, when the Mount Whaleback mine was opened, the biggest single-pit open-cut iron ore mine in the world. The mine is 1.5 kilometres wide and more than five kilometres long. A new town, Newman, was constructed, as well as a 426 kilometre railway line, the Mount Newman railway. The first train left Newman on 1 January 1969 and the first shipment of Newman ore left port on 1 April 1969 on board Osumi Maru.

The Jimblebar mine, 41 kilometres from Newman, was opened in March 1989 and has the capacity to produce 14 million tonnes of iron ore annually via a two-stage crushing circuit. Originally known as McCamey's Monster, after prospector Ken McCamey, the mine was acquired by BHP in 1992. While the mine is fully owned by BHP Billiton, it does also process ore from the Wheelara deposit, which is jointly owned by BHP and a number of Chinese and Japanese companies.

Ore from the mines is transported by rail to Port Hedland through two independent railways. The Mount Newman railway carries ore from Mount Whaleback, Orebodies 18, 23, 25 and 29, Jimblebar, Yandi and Area C. The Yarrie mine is serviced by the separate, shorter Goldsworthy railway. Jimblebar is at the end of a 32 kilometre spur line of the Mount Newman railway.

Ore from the Mount Whaleback and the other Newman mines, as well as the Yandi mine is transported to the port at Nelson Point, while ore from Area C and Yarrie goes to Finucane Island. Ore is transported through a 1.16 kilometre long tunnel from Nelson Point to the port at Finucane Island. The average loading time for a ship is 30 hours, and 800 ships are loaded annually at Port Hedland.

Jimblebar is part of an expansion project, launched in 2010 and aimed at increasing production from the Pilbara mines to 240 million tonnes of iron ore annually by 2013. The expansion of Jimlebar, together with an expansion of the inner harbour at Port Hedland and works on the duplication of rail tracks is estimated to cost A$2.15 billion. The project was originally titled Rapid Growth Project 6, but is now under the umbrella of "Iron Ore Major Projects"'.

In March 2011 Thiess was awarded the $166 million contract to provide bulk earth works and selected infrastructure for Jimblebar.

ALE has been awarded the contract for the BHP Billiton Iron Ore Rapid Growth Project (RGP) 6 as part of the Jimblebar mine site development, Australia. The project involves receiving and transportation over 140 items of cargo, including 110 modules, over a 7-month period. ALE will utilise more than 70 axle lines of SPMT, 120 axle lines of conventional hydraulic trailers, and up to 10 tractor units.
