= Railways in the Pilbara =

Pilbara region iron ore haulage railways

The heavy-haul railways in the Pilbara are a series of company-owned railways in the Pilbara region in the north-west of the state of Western Australia. Their routes total 2782 kilometres (1729 miles).

== History ==
2022 map of iron ore mines in the Pilbara region

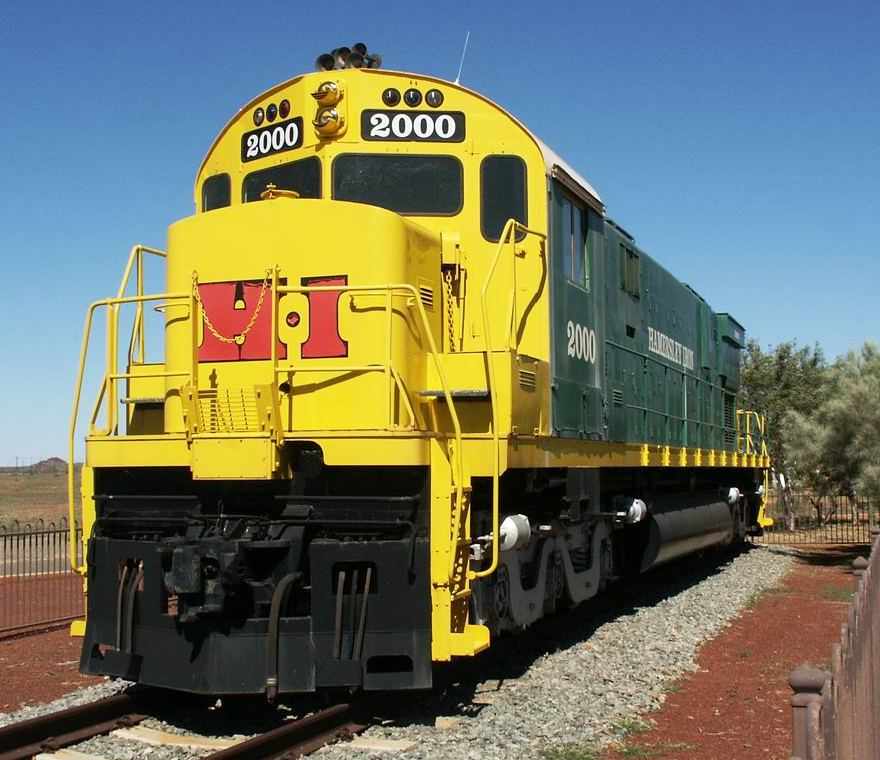
Preserved Hamersley Iron Alco C628 at Dampier in July 2003

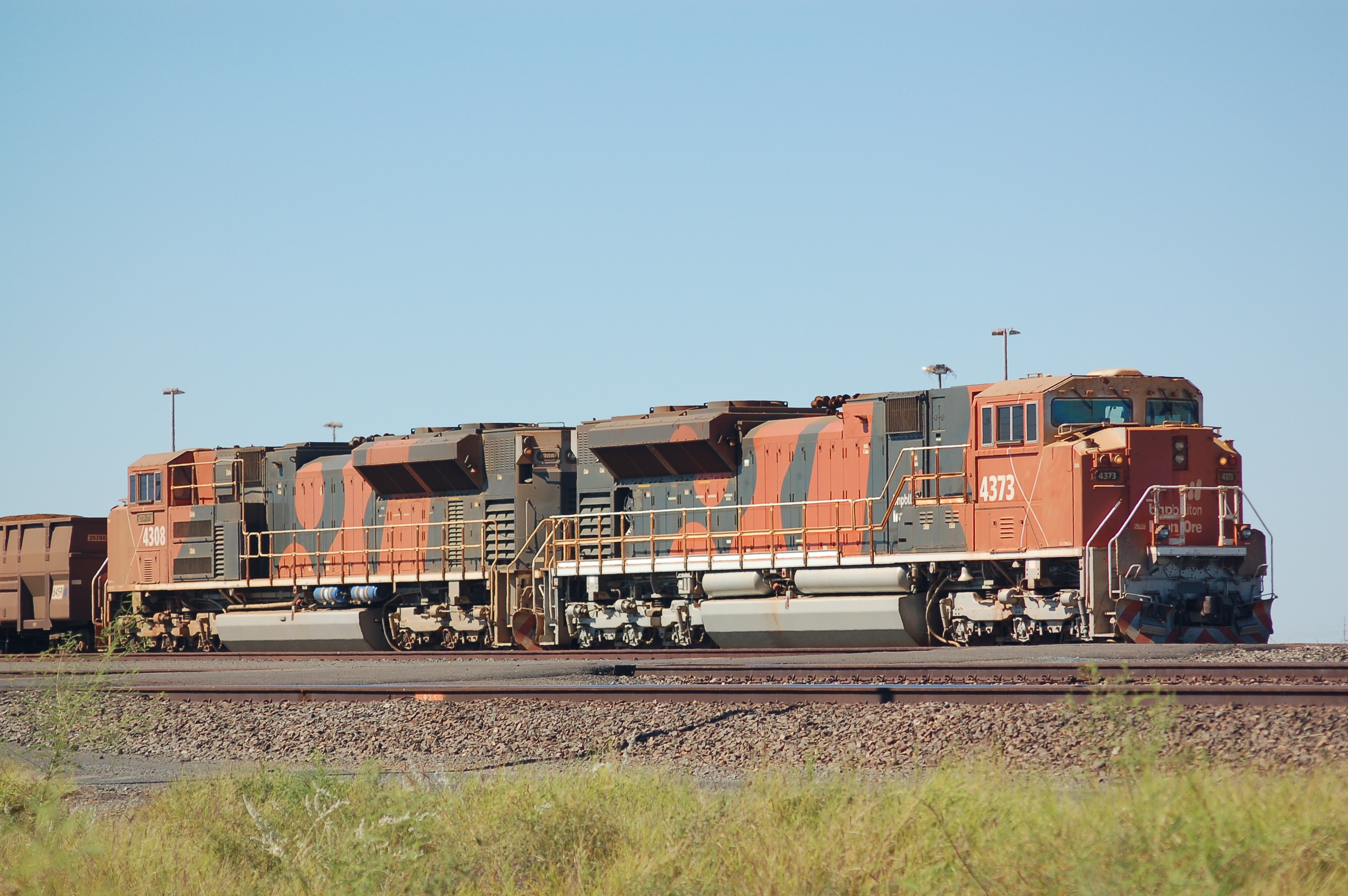
BHP EMD SD70ACes in April 2012

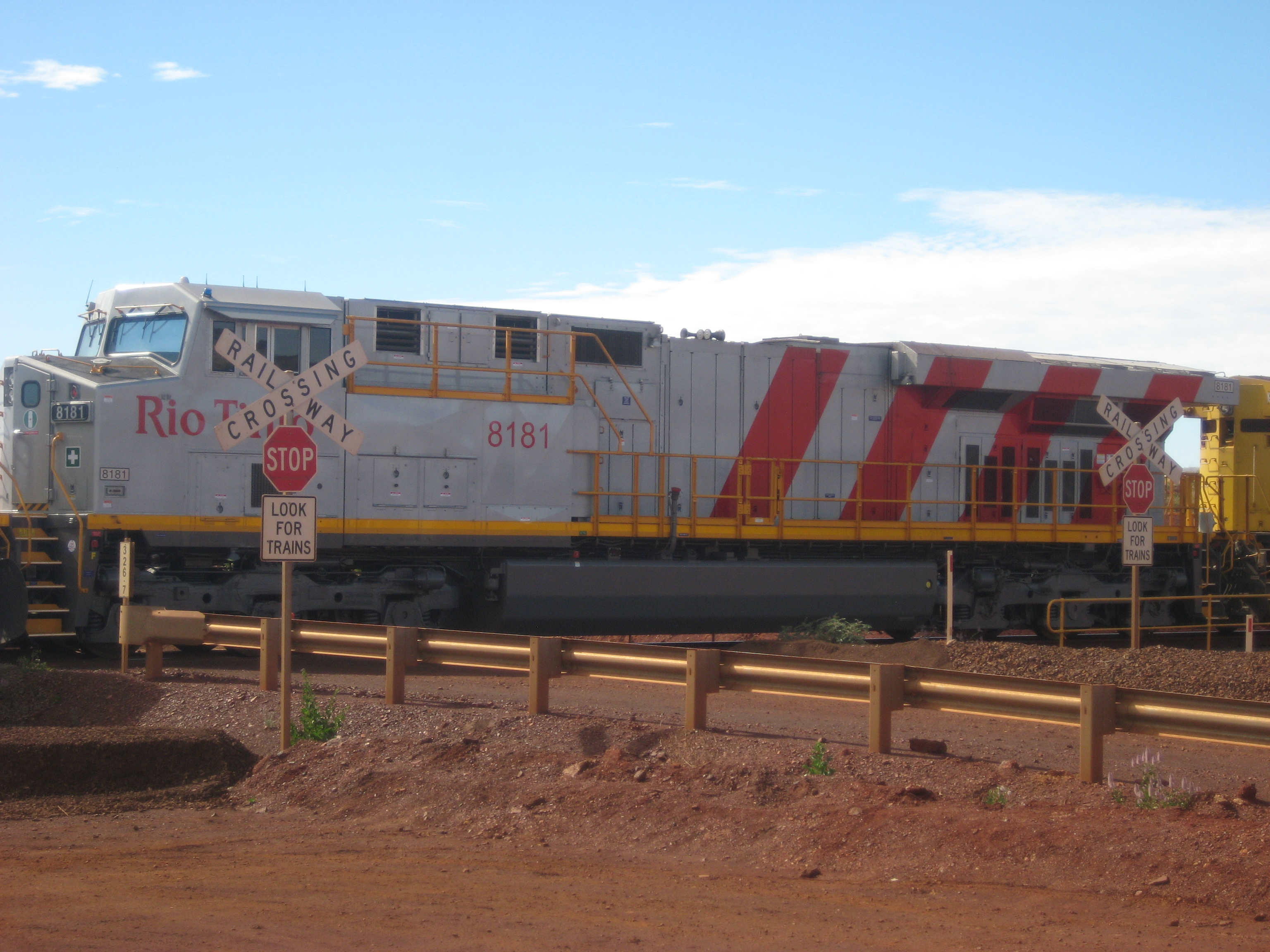
Rio Tinto GE ES44DCi at Brockman 4 mine in June 2012

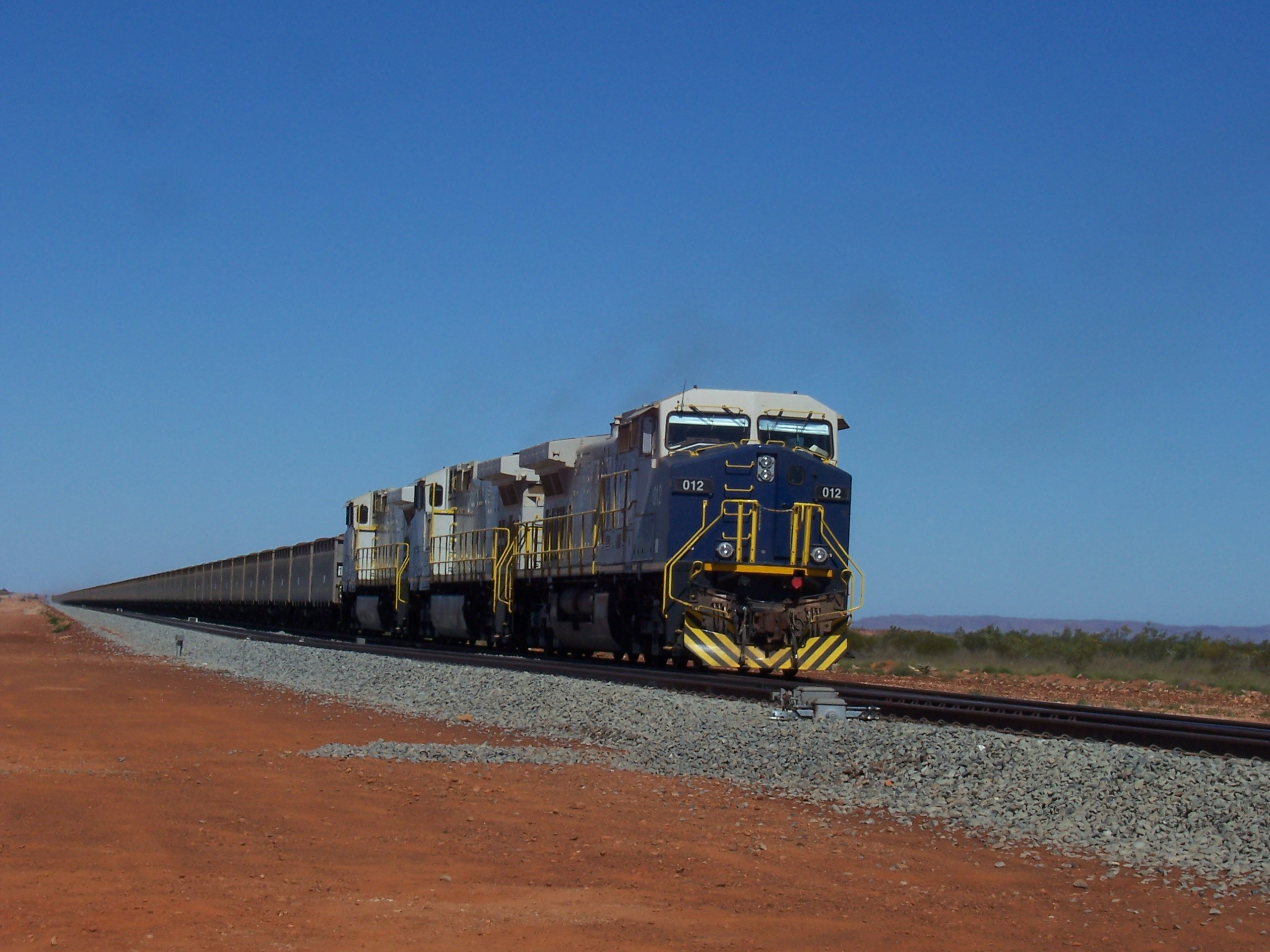
Fortescue Metals Group GE Dash 9-44CWs in May 2008

In 1887, the Cossack Tram opened followed by the Western Australian Government Railways's (WAGR) Marble Bar Railway in 1911. However, these had closed by the 1950s.

Following the Government of Western Australia's opening up of the Pilbara region for mining in the 1960s, four companies began to mine and export iron ore. The long distances from the mines to the sea ports mandated that railways be built as the most economical method to transport the ore. Unlike most of the railways operated by the Western Australian Government Railways, built to 1067 mm (3 ft 6 in) narrow gauge, the Pilbara lines were built to 1435 mm (4 ft 8 1/2 in) standard gauge. Since Australian railway design standards of the time did not provide for heavy-haul railroads of the required capacity, standards set by the Association of American Railroads were followed for track, rolling stock, and loading gauge (width and height of rail vehicles). The railways were built by a joint venture of Morrison-Knudsen, Mannix Contractors of Canada and McDonald Constructions of Australia.

The first company to commence operations in June 1966 was Goldsworthy Mining, with a line from Mount Goldsworthy to Finucane Island. In August 1966, Hamersley Iron (a Rio Tinto company) opened a 298-kilometre line from Mount Tom Price to a new port at East Intercourse Island, near Dampier. This was extended shortly after by 100 kilometres to a second mine at Paraburdoo. In March 1969, the Mount Newman Mining joint venture began operating a 427-kilometre line from its Mount Whaleback mine to Port Hedland. The Cliffs Robe River Iron Associates joint venture opened a 162-kilometre line from Mount Enid to Cape Lambert, near Wickham, in July 1972.

Since then, the iron ore trackage has been expanded as new mines have opened. With mergers and takeovers, there has been considerable consolidation of mine (and railroad trackage) ownership, particularly with BHP and Rio Tinto.

On 21 June 2001, eight BHP Billiton GE AC6000CWs combined to set the world record for the longest and heaviest train; hauling a 682-car, 99,734 gross-tonne (82,000 tonnes of ore), 7.3 kilometre-long train. In April 2008, Fortescue Metals Group opened a line from Cloud Break mine to Port Hedland. In November 2015, Hancock Prospecting opened a 344 kilometre line from Roy Hill.

In 2013, Aurizon in conjunction with Brockman Mining and Atlas Iron under an Alliance Study Agreement, completed a study for a new independent iron ore railway in the Pilbara. As of 2014, iron ore trackage in the Pilbara was 2,295 kilometres long. It accounted for 94% of all Australian iron ore exports.

In 2020, Rio Tinto completed their "AutoHaul" project fully automating their 200+ engine fleet into a driverless configuration.

== Railways ==
- Fortescue railway — owned and operated by FMG.
- Goldsworthy railway and Mount Newman railway — owned and operated by BHP.
- Hamersley & Robe River railway — majority-owned by Rio Tinto and operated by its subsidiary Pilbara Iron.
- Roy Hill railway — owned and operated by Hancock Prospecting.

== Rolling stock ==
Goldsworthy Mining operated locomotives to the same design as the WAGR H and K classes as well as one EMD JT42C (GML10, based on both the V/Line N and Australian National DL classes).

The other three mining companies operate larger locomotives built to take advantage of the wide (American) loading gauge. Some were built under licence in Australia by AE Goodwin, Comeng, and rebuilt by A Goninan & Co and Clyde Engineering, however most have been imported from the United States.

Locomotives operated have included members of the following classes:

=== Alco ===
- Alco C628
- Alco C630
- Alco C636
- Montreal Locomotive Works M636

=== GE Transportation ===
- GE C36-7
- GE CM39-8
- GE Dash 9-44CW
- GE AC6000CW
- GE ES44ACi
- GE ES44DCi

=== Electro-Motive Diesel ===
- EMD SD50
- EMD SD40R
- EMD SD40-2
- EMD SD70ACe/lc

== Ports ==
The large-tonnage heavy-duty iron ore shipments require deep-water ports, which have to accommodate very high tidal ranges.

- BHP
  - Port Hedland
  - Mount Newman
  - Port Hedland
  - Goldsworthy – now closed
  - Shay Gap
  - Yarrie mine
- Rio Tinto
  - Dampier
  - Hamersley
  - Cape Lambert
  - Robe River
- Fortescue Metals Group
  - Point Anderson near Port Hedland
  - Christmas Creek mine

== In development ==
- Anketell Port, near Cape Lambert

== Engineering heritage award ==
The heavy haul railways received an Engineering Heritage International Marker from Engineers Australia as part of its Engineering Heritage Recognition Program.
