= Mount Newman railway line =

Private railway in Pilbara region of Western Australia

Mount Newman railway
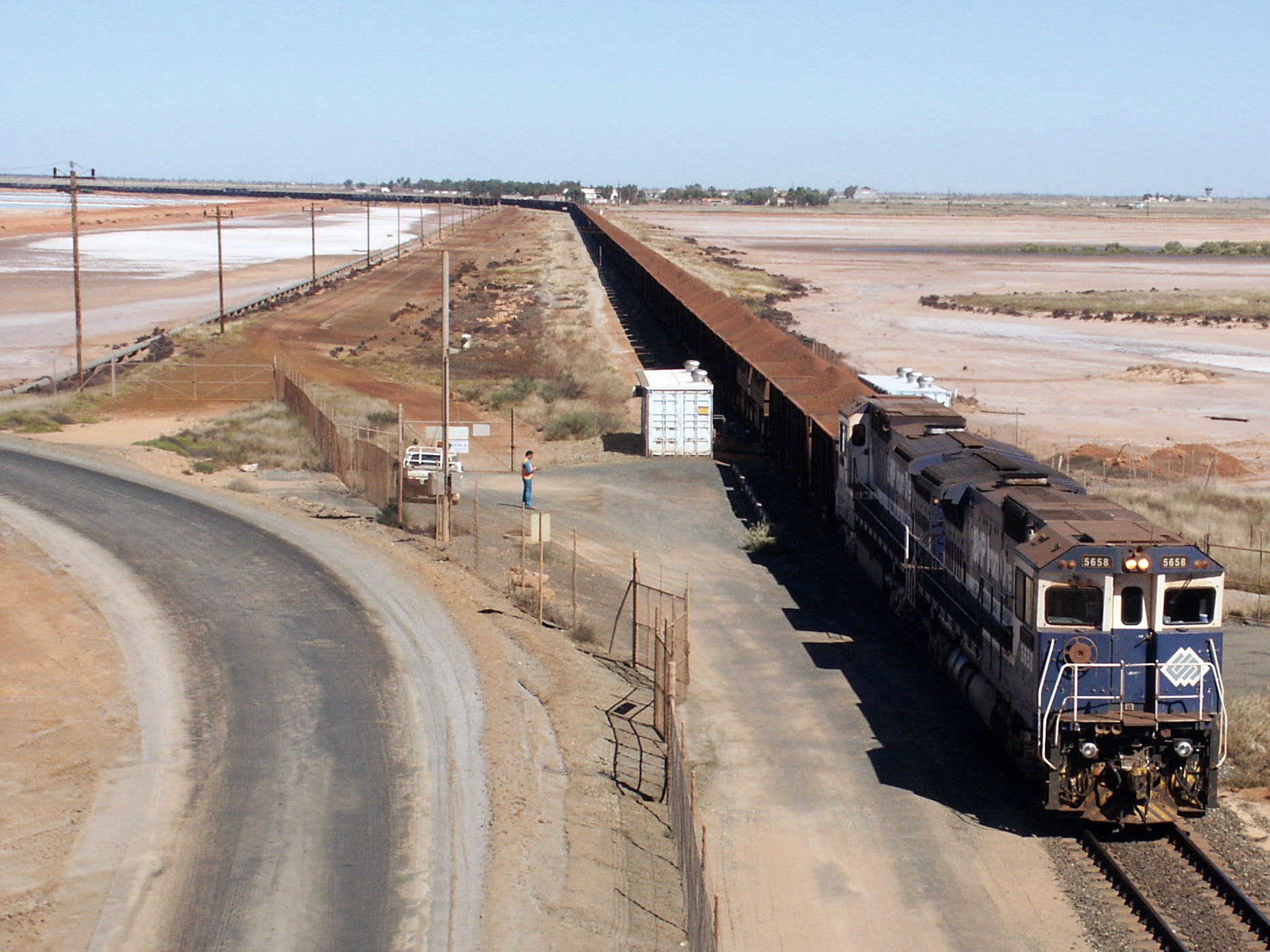
- CM40-8Ms at Port Hedland in August 2003

Overview
- Status: Operational
- Locale: Pilbara, Western Australia
- Termini: Newman; Finucane Island

Service
- Type: Heavy rail
- System: Pilbara
- Operator: BHP
- Depot: Port Hedland

History
- Opened: 22 January 1969

Technical
- Line length: 426 km (264.70 mi)
- Track gauge: 1,435 mm (4 ft 8 1/2 in)
- Train protection system: ATP using Alstom Ultra-Cab II
Route map
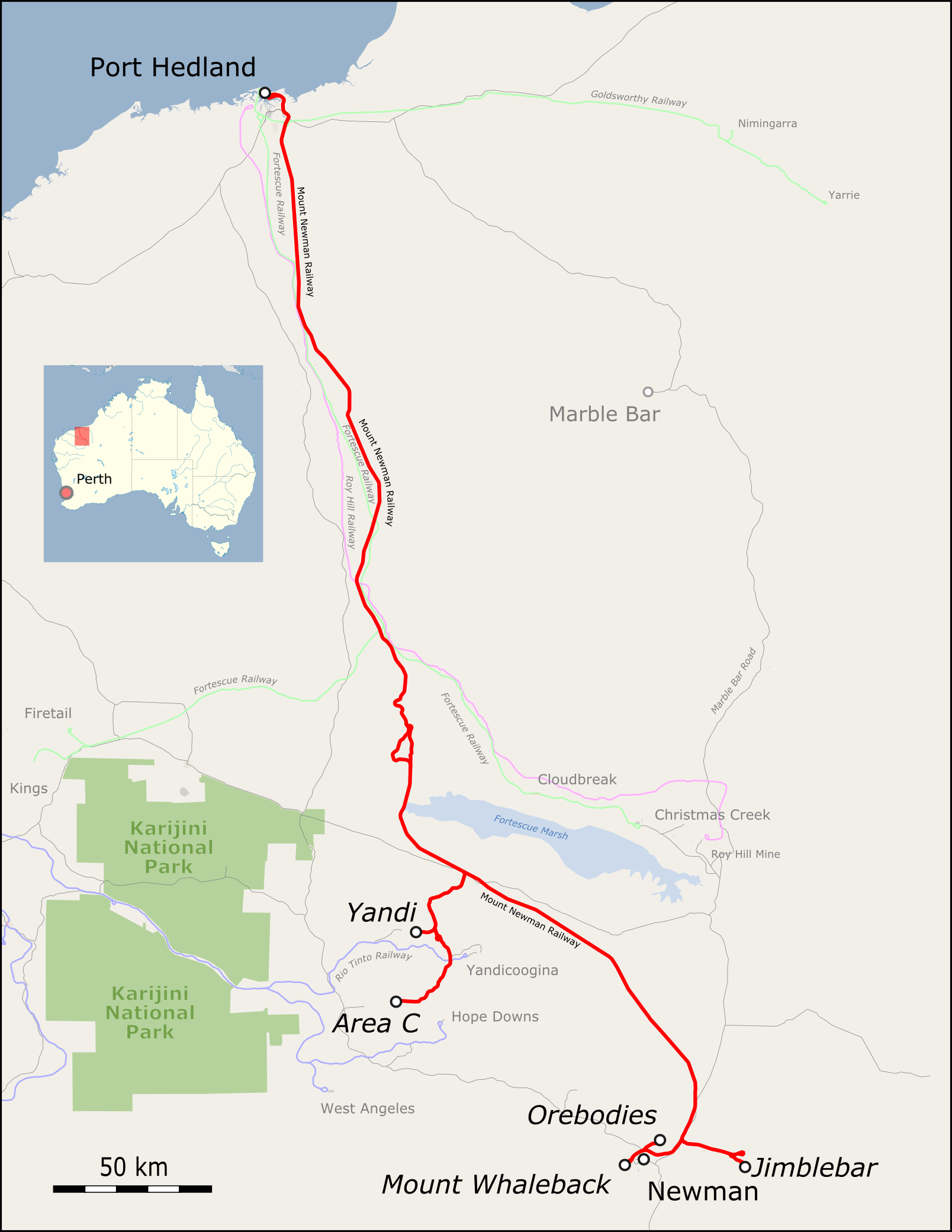

The Mount Newman railway, owned and operated by BHP, is a private rail network in the Pilbara region of Western Australia built to carry iron ore. It is one of two railway lines BHP operates in the Pilbara, the other being the Goldsworthy railway.

In addition to the BHP network, there are three more independent iron ore rail lines in the Pilbara: Rio Tinto operate the Hamersley & Robe River railway, Fortescue Metals Group the Fortescue railway, and Hancock Prospecting the Roy Hill railway.

== History ==
Railways in the Pilbara region. BHP railways, including the Mount Newman railway, are in red .

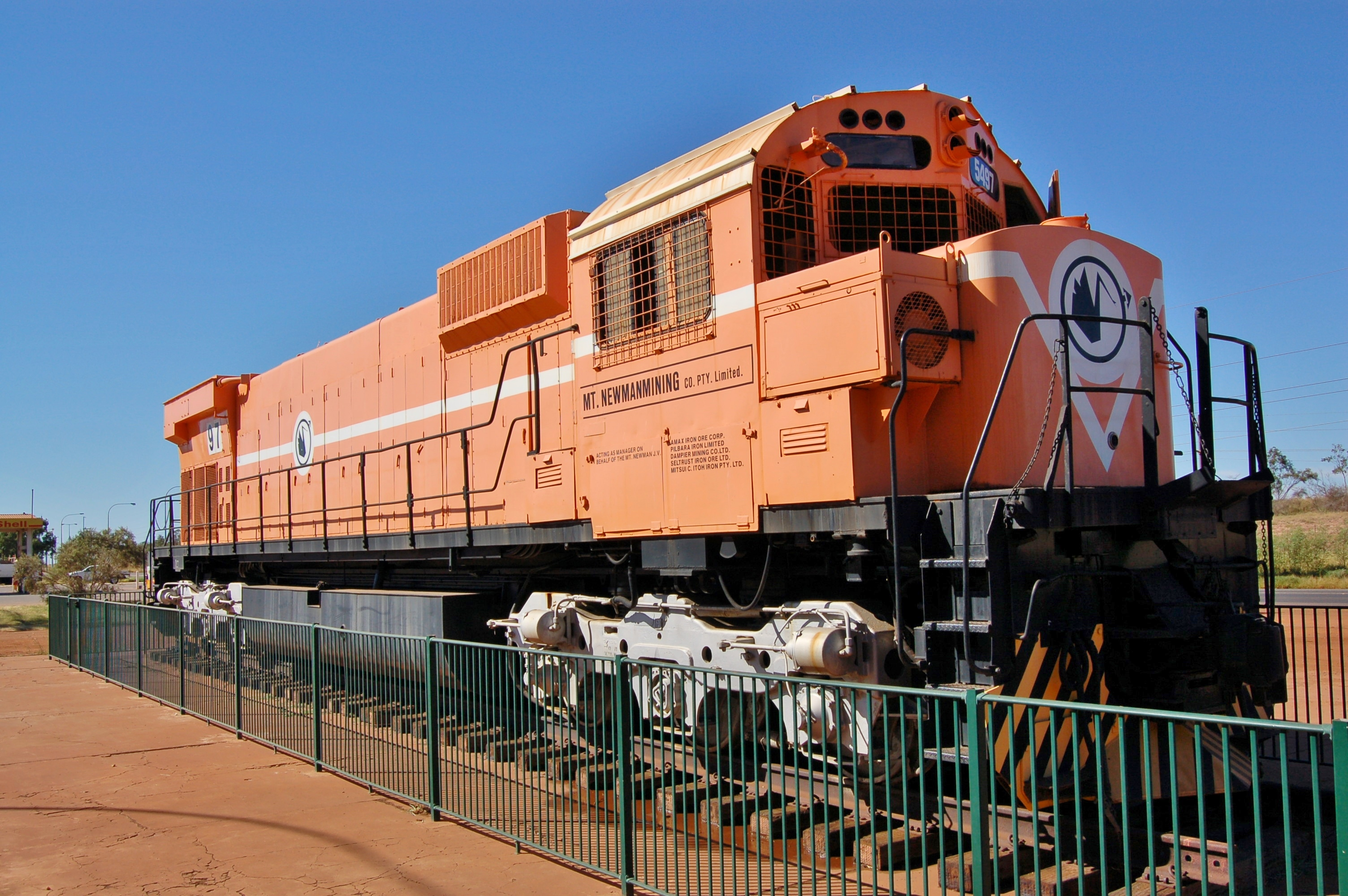
Preserved 5497 at the Don Rhodes Mining and Transport Museum in April 2012

The Mount Newman railway runs for 426 kilometres, from Newman to Port Hedland, and is one of Australia's longest private railways. The line, along with its spur lines to Mount Whaleback, Orebodies 18, 23 and 25, Jimblebar, Yandi and Area C, services the iron ore mines at Newman. It has the longest and heaviest trains in the world. The railway line was officially opened on 22 January 1969 by Premier David Brand.

Voice and data communications utilise a digitally trunked P25 VHF radio system and SDH transmission via either fibre or microwave linked repeater sites. The vast majority of remote repeater sites are solar powered with generator backup. The system is maintained by BHP Billiton Rail Communication Technicians based out of Port Hedland's Nelson Point and Newman. All track side infrastructure such as wayside monitoring equipment, signals, switch motors, telemetry data and monitoring devices are solar powered and are monitored and controlled out of the Integrated Remote Operations Centre (IROC) in Perth.

The rail journey from Newman to Port Hedland typically takes about eight hours. The 268 car trains are 2.89 kilometres long, with each wagon carrying up to 138 tonnes.

At the end of 2012, BHP Billiton opened its new train control facility. All train control function now operates from Perth.

On 21 June 2001, the line broke the world record for the heaviest train as well as the longest train when a train weighing 99,734 tons and formed of 682 wagons ran for 275 kilometres between Yandi and Port Hedland. The train was 7.3 kilometres long, carried 82,000 tons of iron ore, and was hauled by eight GE AC6000CW locomotives.

In 2018 a runaway train travelling north from Newman to Port Hedland was deliberately derailed near Turner Siding after travelling 90 km in just 50 minutes.

== Rolling stock ==
To operate construction trains, in December 1967, Mount Newman Mining purchased two Electro Motive Diesel F7 locomotives from Western Pacific Railroad; these were retired in 1971.

To operate services, Mount Newman received its first Alco 636 locomotives in June 1968. A total of 54 (5452–5505) had been purchased by December 1977 with 33 manufactured by AE Goodwin and 21 by Commonwealth Engineering.

In January 1987, the first of eight (5506–5513) to be rebuilt by A Goninan & Co, Welshpool as CM36-7s was delivered. These were withdrawn in 1999. Two (5507/08) were overhauled by United Group and leased to Pilbara Rail until withdrawn in 2009.

These were followed by a further 34 (5634–5645, 5648–5669) that were rebuilt as CM40-8Ms. To save costs three (5663–5665) were built without cabs, however this compromised operational efficiency so they were retrofitted.

Between September 1988 and December 1988, A Goninan & Co manufactured four new CM39-8s (5630–5633). These were later upgraded to CM40-8s. These were followed in November 1992 by two CM40-8s (5646–5647).

The last of the unrebuilt 636s was withdrawn in February 1995 with 5497 preserved at the Port Hedland Machinery Park, 5499 by Rail Heritage WA and 5502 by Pilbara Railway Museum.

In 1999, eight GE Transportation AC6000CWs (6070–6077) were purchased. With a power output of 4.66 MW (6,249 hp), these are the most powerful locomotives in Australia. These were withdrawn in 2013.

Suffering a motive power shortage and with new deliveries two years away, in 2003, BHP Billiton purchased nine EMD SD40R and 12 EMD SD40-2s (3086–3097) from Electro-Motive Diesel. They dated from 1966, and had previously been operated by Iowa, Chicago and Eastern Railroad, Southern Pacific and Union Pacific Railroad. The last of these were withdrawn in December 2013.

In February 2006, BHP Billiton took delivery of the first of 105 EMD SD70ACe/lcs (4301–4404). Included were ten that were destined for BNSF, that BHP Billiton purchased off the production line, hence they were delivered in BNSF livery. The first member of the class was purchased for parts and dismantled upon arrival in Australia. This was because it was cheaper to buy a complete locomotive than buy the components individually.

== Popular culture ==
In 2024 an Australian musical, Straight from the Strait, premiered in Queensland. The musical by Norah Bagiri and Rubina Kimiia tells the story of Torres Strait Islander workers who relocated to help lay the track in the 1960s.
