= Area C (disambiguation) =

Area C may refer to:

- Area C (West Bank), one of the three administrative divisions of the West Bank, set out in the Oslo Accords
- Area C mine, an iron ore mine located in the Pilbara region of Western Australia
- Milan Area C, a congestion charge scheme implemented in the city of Milan
