= South Flank mine =

Iron ore mine in Western Australia

- Location in Western Australia
- Interactive map of South Flank mine
- Location: Shire of East Pilbara, Pilbara, Western Australia, Australia; 22°59′27″S 118°52′43″E
- Products: Iron ore
- Production: 80 Million TPA (Projected)
- Opened: 2021
- Company: BHP
- Website: BHP website

The South Flank mine is an iron ore mine located in the Pilbara region of Western Australia, 156 kilometres northwest of Newman. and approximately 9 km to the south of BHPs Mining Area C operation. Construction at South Flank began in July 2018, the Mine is already producing ore and is partially complete, once opened it will become the largest processing facility in Western Australia.

BHP is the second-largest iron ore mining company in the Pilbara, behind Rio Tinto and ahead of the Fortescue Metals Group. As of 2010, BHP employs 8,000 people in its Pilbara operations.

The mine is expected to operate for a minimum of 25 years and produce in excess of 70 million tonnes of iron ore per annum, at a construction cost in excess of US$3.6 billion. Construction of the mine employed around 2,500 people at its peak, with a staff of 600 permanent employees during operation.
