= Goldsworthy railway line =

Private railway in Pilbara region of Western Australia

Goldsworthy railway
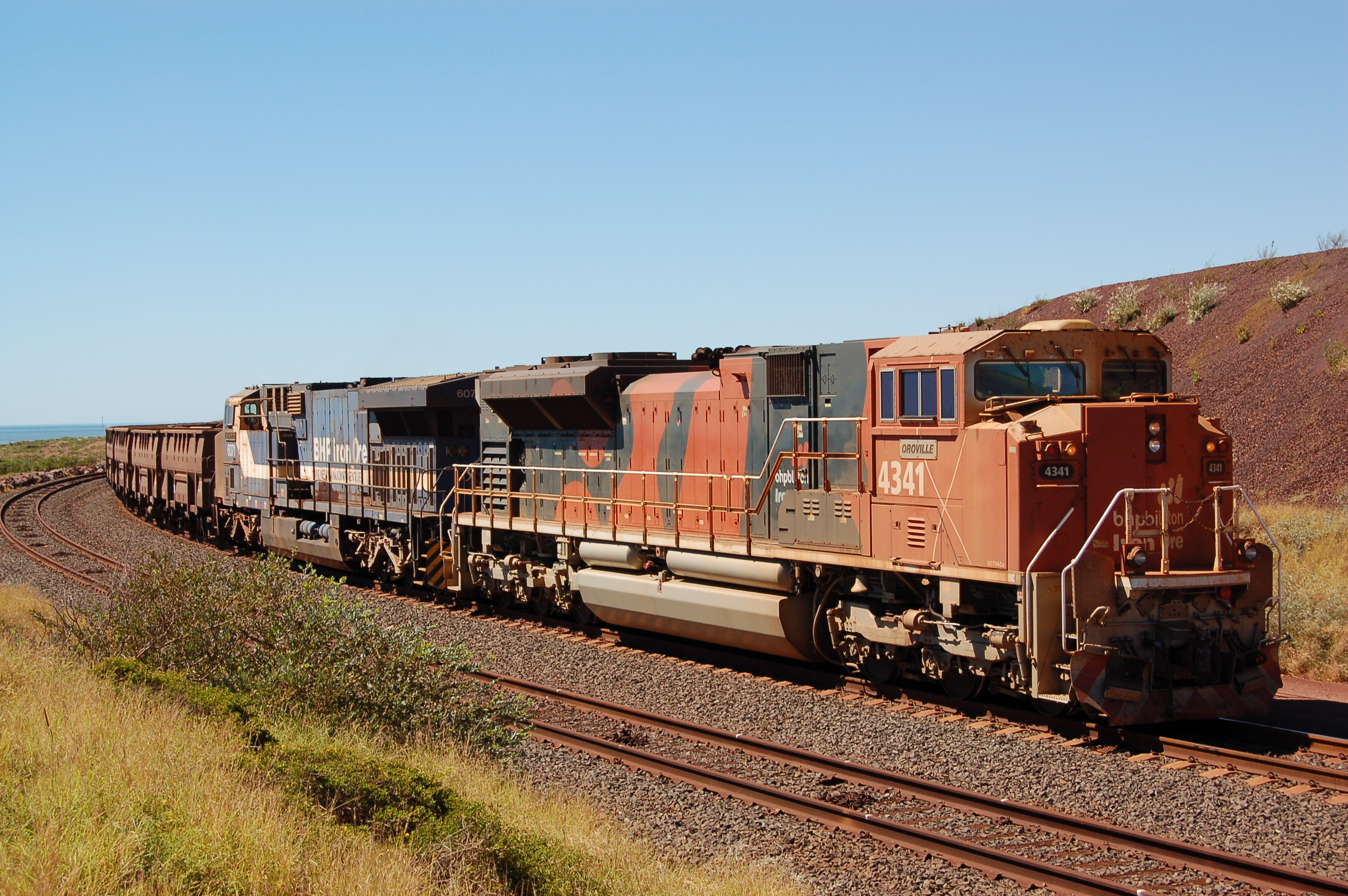
- 4341 leads 6071 on the Finucane Island loop in April 2012

Overview
- Status: Closed
- Locale: Pilbara, Western Australia
- Termini: Yarrie mine; Finucane Island

Service
- Type: Heavy rail
- System: Pilbara
- Operator: BHP
- Depot: Port Hedland

History
- Opened: 25 May 1966
- Closed: February 2014

Technical
- Line length: 208 km (129.25 mi)
- Track gauge: 1,435 mm (4 ft 8 1/2 in) standard gauge
- Train protection system: ATP using Alstom Ultra-Cab II

The Goldsworthy railway, owned and operated by BHP, was a private rail network in the Pilbara region of Western Australia built to carry iron ore. It is one of two railway lines BHP operates in the Pilbara, the other being the Mount Newman railway.

In addition to the BHP network, there are three more independent iron ore rail lines in the Pilbara. One is operated by Rio Tinto, the Hamersley & Robe River railway, the Fortescue Metals Group operates the Fortescue railway and Hancock Prospecting the Roy Hill railway.

== History ==
Railways in the Pilbara region. BHP railways, including the Goldsworthy railway, are in red .

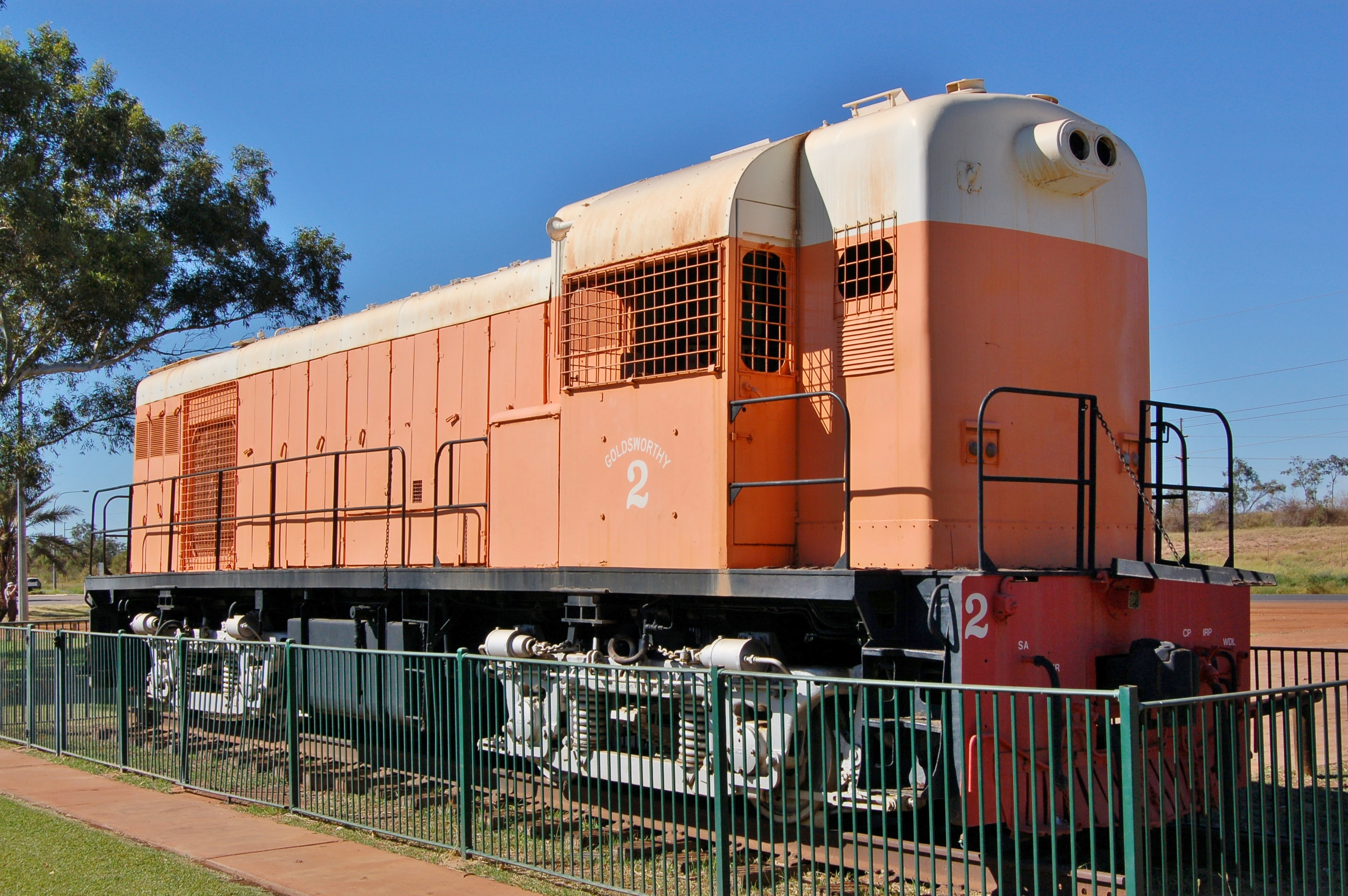
Preserved locomotive no 2 at the Don Rhodes Mining and Transport Museum in April 2012

In May 1966, the 112 kilometre Goldsworthy railway opened to transport iron ore from Mount Goldsworthy mine to the port on Finucane Island. The line was extended to Shay Gap in 1972 and Yarrie mine in 1993.

On 1 March 1991, the Goldsworthy Mining and Mount Newman Mining were amalgamated under the BHP Iron Ore brand.

In June 2004, the National Competition Council of Australia received an application from the Fortescue Metals Group (FMG) to use part of the Mount Newman railway and also part of the Goldsworthy railway.

In June 2010, the Australian Competition Tribunal ruled that FMG be granted access to Rio Tinto's Robe River line and BHP Billiton's Goldsworthy line but not to the busier Hamersley and Mount Newman lines. Treasurer Wayne Swan suggested that several advantages would accrue from access to the rail lines by third parties. It would increase competition, reduce duplication of infrastructure, and reduce environmental damage.

Access to the rail networks by third parties is governed by the State Agreements Act.

== Operation ==
The Goldsworthy railway is 208 kilometres (129 mi) long, connecting the Yarrie mine to Finucane Island, near Port Hedland.

Unlike Mount Newman line trains, with up to 208 wagons per train, Goldsworthy line trains only have 90 wagons per train. Each wagon carries up to 126 tonnes (124 long tons; 139 short tons) of ore.

== Rolling stock ==
In December 1965, Mount Goldsworthy Mining Co took delivery of two English Electric, Rocklea locomotives (no 1 & 2) to the same design as the Western Australian Government Railways H class. Initially used on construction trains, they were later used on general freight trains and shunting duties. One was written off in an accident in 1968 with some parts incorporated into a new frame built by English Electric in 1970.

In 1966, the first of six English Electric, Rocklea built locomotives (no 3 to 8) to the same design as the Western Australian Government Railways K class. After one was damaged in 1968, a K class was purchased from the Western Australian Government Railways followed by another in July 1986. In November 1992 all were transferred to BHP's Port Kembla operation. By this stage, the infrastructure had been upgraded to allow GE Transportation 36-7 locomotives to take over the line.

In 1990, Clyde Engineering built GML10 was purchased. It was sold to Comalco in August 1994.

In March 2012, BHP Billiton placed an order for 80 Electro-Motive Diesel SD70ACe/LCi locomotives for use on its Western Australia mining railroads.
