= Port Robinson =

Port Robinson or Pt Robinson may refer to:

- Port Robinson, Ontario
- Port Robinson, adjoining Cheviot, New Zealand
- Port Robinson, Western Australia, also known as Anketell Port
