= Petrohawk =

Defunct American energy corporation

Petrohawk Energy Corporation
- Company type: Public
- Industry: Energy / Oil and gas
- Founded: 2003
- Successor: BHP Billiton
- Headquarters: Houston, Texas, United States
- Area served: United States
- Key people: Floyd Wilson (Chairman), (President) & (CEO)
- Products: Petrochemical
- Revenue: ▲US$ 883.40 million (2007)
- Operating income: ▲US$ 250.65 million (2007)
- Net income: ▼US$ 52.90 million (2007)
- Total assets: ▲US$ 4.672 billion (2007)
- Total equity: ▲US$ 2.008 billion (2007)
- Number of employees: 262 (2008)
- Website: www.petrohawk.com

Petrohawk Energy Corporation was an independent energy company headquartered in Houston, Texas. Founded in 2003, Petrohawk grew rapidly through mergers and acquisitions. The company was originally known as Beta Oil & Gas until shareholders approved a name change on July 15, 2004.

In November 2004, Petrohawk bought Wynn-Crosby for $425 million, marking its first large acquisition. The Wynn-Crosby/ Petrohawk transaction was named the “2004 M&A Deal of the Year” by The Oil and Gas Investor. In July 2005, Petrohawk merged with Mission Resources, nearly doubling in size. One year later, Petrohawk bought KCS Energy for 80 million shares of stock and approximately $900 million in cash. Beginning in 2007, Petrohawk began acquiring acreage in the Haynesville Shale, and in 2008 successfully began an extensive, $500 million drilling program.

On July 15, 2011, BHP Billiton acquired Petrohawk for an all-cash offer of $US38.75 per share.
