= Orebodies 18, 23 and 25 mine =

Iron ore mine in Western Australia

- Location in Western Australia
- Interactive map of Orebodies 18, 23 and 25 mine
- Location: Shire of East Pilbara, Pilbara, Western Australia, Australia; 23°20′23″S 119°47′59″E
- Products: Iron ore
- Production: Nominal capacity: 12 million tonnes/annum Combined production: 63 million tonnes/annum (for the Newman Hub, consisting of Newman West and East)
- Financial year: 2021
- Company: BHP (85%); Mitsui Iron (10%); Itochu (5%)
- Website: www.bhp.com

The Orebodies 18, 23 and 25 mine, part of BHP's Eastern Ridge hub and officially referred to as the Newman East operation, is an iron ore mine located in the Pilbara region of Western Australia, eight kilometres east of Newman.

The mine is owned by BHP (85%), Mitsui Iron (10%) and Itochu (5%).

== Overview ==
Iron ore mines in the Pilbara region

At Orebody 25, BHP operates a processing plant consisting of a primary and secondary crusher, and a screening plant. BHP does not report the annual production of the mine separately, but rather together with its other Newman operations which, in 2009/10, produced a combined 37 million tonnes of ore.

Orebody 23 and 25 were operated by HWE Mining and Orebody 18 by Macmahon Holdings. In 2011 and 2014, BHP Billiton brought operations in house.
