= Straight from the Strait =

Australian musical

- A Torres Strait Island Musical
- Music: Rubina Kimiia
- Lyrics: Norah Bagiri
- Book: Rubina Kimiia; Norah Bagiri
- Premiere: 28 August 2024: Playhouse, Queensland Performing Arts Centre, Brisbane
- Awards: 2024 Queensland Matilda Award for Best Musical or Cabaret

Straight from the Strait is an Australian musical with a book by Norah Bagirim and Rubina Kimiia; Bagirim wrote the lyrics, and Kimiia wrote the music.

It tells the story of Torres Strait Islander workers far from home in the Pilbara in the late 1960s laying track on the Mount Newman railway, and breaking a world record by laying seven kilometres of track in under 12 hours. The score includes both contemporary and traditional Torres Strait musical styles, featuring Meriam Mir, Kala Lagaw Ya and Torres Strait Creole languages as well as English.

Straight from the Strait premiered from 28 to 31 August 2024 in Brisbane at the Queensland Performing Arts Centre's Playhouse, presented by Opera Queensland, Yumpla Nerkep Foundation and QPAC in association with Brisbane Festival.

It was named Best Musical or Cabaret at the 2025 Queensland Matilda Awards.

== Principal cast ==
Character	Performer
Boyor	Paul Isakara Williams
Kusa	Harold Pascoe
Pinau	Vaughan Wapau
Serai	Gertrude Benjamin
Isobel	Georgia Corowa
Mama	Ghenoa Gela
Man Mountain	Jalen Sutcliffe
Protector Man/Bradco Bala/John Richardson	Zeek Power
Levi	Joseph Tapau
Bobby B	Edward Lampton
Jimmy	Marcus Corowa
Sid	Zane Lemusu
Uncle Reuben/Simeon	Maurice Sailor
H&S Officer & Joe	Kani Puru
Reporter	Cleopatra Pryce

== Reception ==
=== Awards ===
Year	Award	Category	Nominee	Result	Ref.
2024	Matilda Awards	Best Set Design	Kevin O'Brien	Won	
2024	Matilda Awards	Best Lighting Design	Jason Glenwright	Won	
2024	Matilda Awards	Best Direction	Nadine McDonald-Dowd	Nominated	
2024	Matilda Awards	Best Performance in a Leading Role - Mainstage Production	Vaughan Wapau	Nominated	
2024	Matilda Awards	Best Performance in a Supporting Role - Mainstage Production	Georgia Corowa	Nominated	
2024	Matilda Awards	Best Musical or Cabaret		Won	
2024	Matilda Awards	The Judges Award		Won	
