= Yandi mine =

Iron ore mine in Western Australia

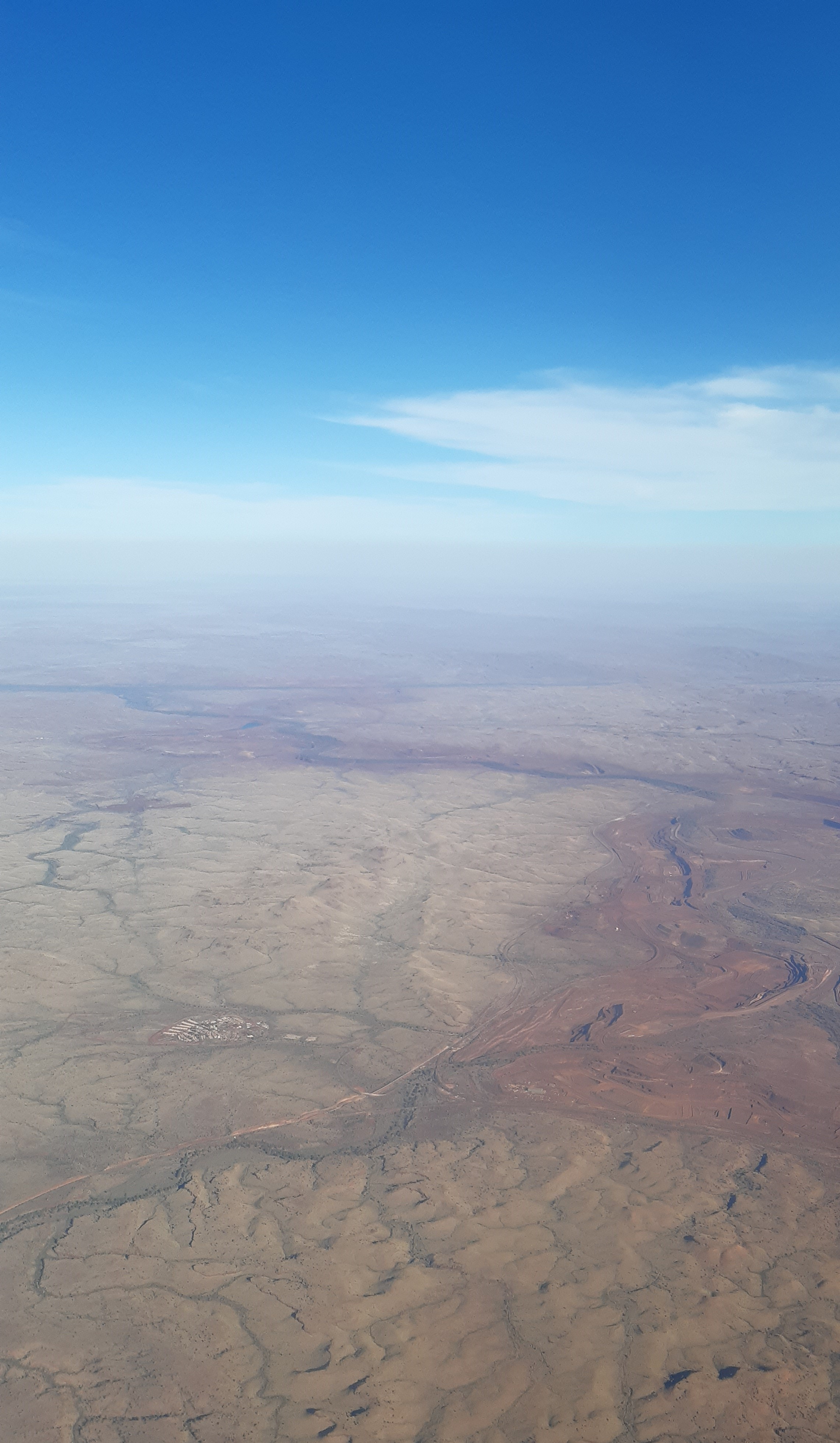
- Yandi mine from the air in October 2021

- Location in Western Australia
- Interactive map of Yandi mine
- Location: Shire of East Pilbara, Western Australia, Australia; 22°44′01″S 119°07′06″E
- Products: Iron ore
- Production: 68 million tonnes
- Financial year: 2021
- Opened: 1991
- Company: BHP (85%); Itochu (8%); Mitsui Iron (7%)
- Website: www.bhp.com

The Yandi mine is an iron ore mine located in the Pilbara region of Western Australia, 90 kilometres north-west of Newman. It should not be confused with Rio Tinto's nearby Yandicoogina mine, which is also sometimes shortened to Yandi.

The mine is owned by BHP (85%), Itochu (8%) and Mitsui Iron (7%). In 2021, the mine commenced its end-of-life winding down with the South Flank mine scheduled to replace it. However with demand from Asian steel mills for its iron ore with low levels of impurities, it was granted an extension, albeit with a reduced output.

== Overview ==
Iron ore mines in the Pilbara region

Operations at Yandi commenced in 1991, with the first ore shipment taking place in 1992. The plant was upgraded from 1994 to 2003 to its current capacity of 41 million tonnes annually. The mine consists of three processing plants and two train loading facilities.

Mining operations within BHP throughout the Pilbara were briefly suspended in September 2008 to focus on safety after two fatalities at the Yandi mine within 10 days of each other.

From its opening, the mine was operated by HWE Mining. In September 2011, BHP Billiton brought operations in house.
