= Yarrie mine =

Iron ore mine in Western Australia

- Location in Western Australia
- Interactive map of Yarrie mine
- Location: Shire of East Pilbara, Pilbara, Western Australia, Australia; 20°36′47″S 120°18′12″E
- Products: Iron ore
- Production: 2 million tonnes/annum
- Opened: 1993
- Closed: 2014
- Company: BHP (85%); Itochu (8%); Mitsui Iron (7%)
- Website: BHP Billiton website

The Yarrie mine is an iron ore mine located in the Pilbara region of Western Australia, 90 kilometres north-east of Marble Bar.

The mine is majority-owned (85 percent) and operated by BHP and is one of seven iron ore mines the company operates in the Pilbara. The company also operates two port facilities at Port Hedland, Nelson Point and Finucane Island, and over 1,000 kilometres of rail in the Pilbara. The Yarrie mine is part of the Mount Goldsworthy joint venture, together with the Area C and Nimingarra mine, with the later being in care and maintenance since 2007.

BHP Billiton is the second-largest iron ore mining company in the Pilbara, behind Rio Tinto and ahead of Fortescue Metals Group. As of 2010, BHP employs 8,000 people in its Pilbara operations.

On 25 February 2014, BHP Billiton announced it was suspending iron ore output at Yarrie indefinitely in a drive to cut costs.

== Overview ==
Iron ore mines in the Pilbara region

The first iron ore mine in the Pilbara to develop was the Goldsworthy mine in 1965, and the Goldsworthy railway line as well as port facilities at Finucane Island were constructed. On 1 June 1966, the first shipment of iron ore from the Pilbara left on Harvey S. Mudd.

The Yarri mine opened in December 1993. A number of iron ore mines have been operating in this area, along the Goldsworthy railway, among them the Goldsworthy, Nimingarra and Shay Gap mines, but of those, only Yarrie still remains active. The fixed plant at Yarrie, capable of producing 8 million tonnes of ore per annum, has been placed in care and maintenance as well, with only a smaller, mobile plant now operating at the mine.

== Indigenous affairs ==
In 2007, BHP Billiton awarded a A$300 million contract to Ngarda Civil and Mining, an Aboriginal-owned company, to manage the mine, the largest ever mining contract awarded to an Aboriginal company. As part of the five-year contract, BHP Billiton planned to increase the number of Aboriginal workers at the mine to 70, out of a total of 90 workers. The managing director of Ngarda, Brian Taylor, saw this contract as a positive step, moving Aboriginal people in the region away from government welfare and into permanent employment. Aboriginal Western Australians, in 2007, suffered from an unemployment rate of 14 percent, compare to 3.3 percent for the general population.
