= Anketell Port =

Natural harbour in the Pilbara region of Western Australia

Coordinates: 20°39′S 117°3′E

Anketell Port, also known as Port Robinson, is a natural harbour in the Pilbara region of Western Australia (WA). The port is 10 kilometres (6.2 mi) west of Cape Lambert and 30 kilometres (19 mi) east of Karratha.

According to the WA Mangrove Assessment Project, Port Robinson is the area "south of Dixon Island, east of Cleaverville, west of Bouger Entrance", and north of the "mouth of Rocky Creek plus surrounds".

== History ==
By the 1870s, Port Robinson had become a secondary harbour used by the pearling industry based at Cossack and other coastal shipping.

Use of both Cossack and Port Robinson declined after the pearling fleet moved to Broome during the 1880s. Both Port Robinson and the nearby townsite of Cleaverville were named after William Cleaver Robinson, who served three terms as Governor of Western Australia.

In 1959, the mariners' guide Australia Pilot described Port Robinson as "a snug little harbour available for small vessels with local knowledge, of 8 or 9 feet [2.4 or 2.7 m]".

Plans for a deep water port in the area, named Anketell Port after the nearby Mount Anketell, have been suspended. The proposed West Pilbara Iron Ore Project (WPIOP) combined a multi-user port with a purpose-built heavy haul railway, to proposed iron ore mines nearby. In 2013, Australian Premium Iron Joint Venture (API JV) received primary government approvals – under the Environmental Protection Act 1986 and Environment Protection and Biodiversity Conservation Act 1999 – for the construction of a deep water port. Technical and commercial feasibility studies regarding WPIOP are being developed by the rail freight company Aurizon. In 2014, API JV partners Baosteel of China and Aurizon undertook a $1.4 billion takeover of fellow partner Aquila Resources. This, combined with falling prices for iron internationally, led to uncertainty among stakeholders – including Baosteel, Aurizon, South Korean steelmaker POSCO and transnational private equity company AMCI – regarding the viability of WPIOP, summarised as:

the project’s engineering teams were told to focus on ways to restructure the project to cut its estimated $4.5 billion capital cost [...] dreams of a major new Pilbara port at Anketell are all but over for the near future [...].

== See also ==
- Pilbara Railways
