= Area C mine =

Iron ore mine in Western Australia

- Location in Western Australia
- Interactive map of Area C mine
- Location: Shire of East Pilbara, Pilbara, Western Australia, Australia; 22°55′12″S 118°58′28″E
- Products: Iron ore
- Production: 63 million tonnes
- Financial year: 2021
- Opened: 2003
- Company: BHP (85%); Itochu (8%); Mitsui Iron (7%)
- Website: www.bhp.com

The Area C mine is an iron ore mine located in the Pilbara region of Western Australia, 92 kilometres west-north-west of Newman. The mine is owned by BHP (85%), Itochu (8%) and Mitsui Iron (7%).

The Area C mine is part of the Mount Goldsworthy joint venture, together with the Yarrie and Nimingarra mines.

== Overview ==
Iron ore mines in the Pilbara region

The Area C mine was officially opened on 30 October 2003 by Premier Geoff Gallop, but ore had been railed from the mine to the port since 16 August. However, bulk samples of the ore had been mined and sent to customers since late 2001. The mine was initially scheduled to produce 15 million tonnes of iron ore annually.

Ore from Area C is transported by rail to Port Hedland on the Mount Newman railway line.

The mine was operated by HWE Mining. In September 2011, BHP Billiton brought operations in house.
