= BHP =

Australian multinational mining and metals company

BHP Group Limited

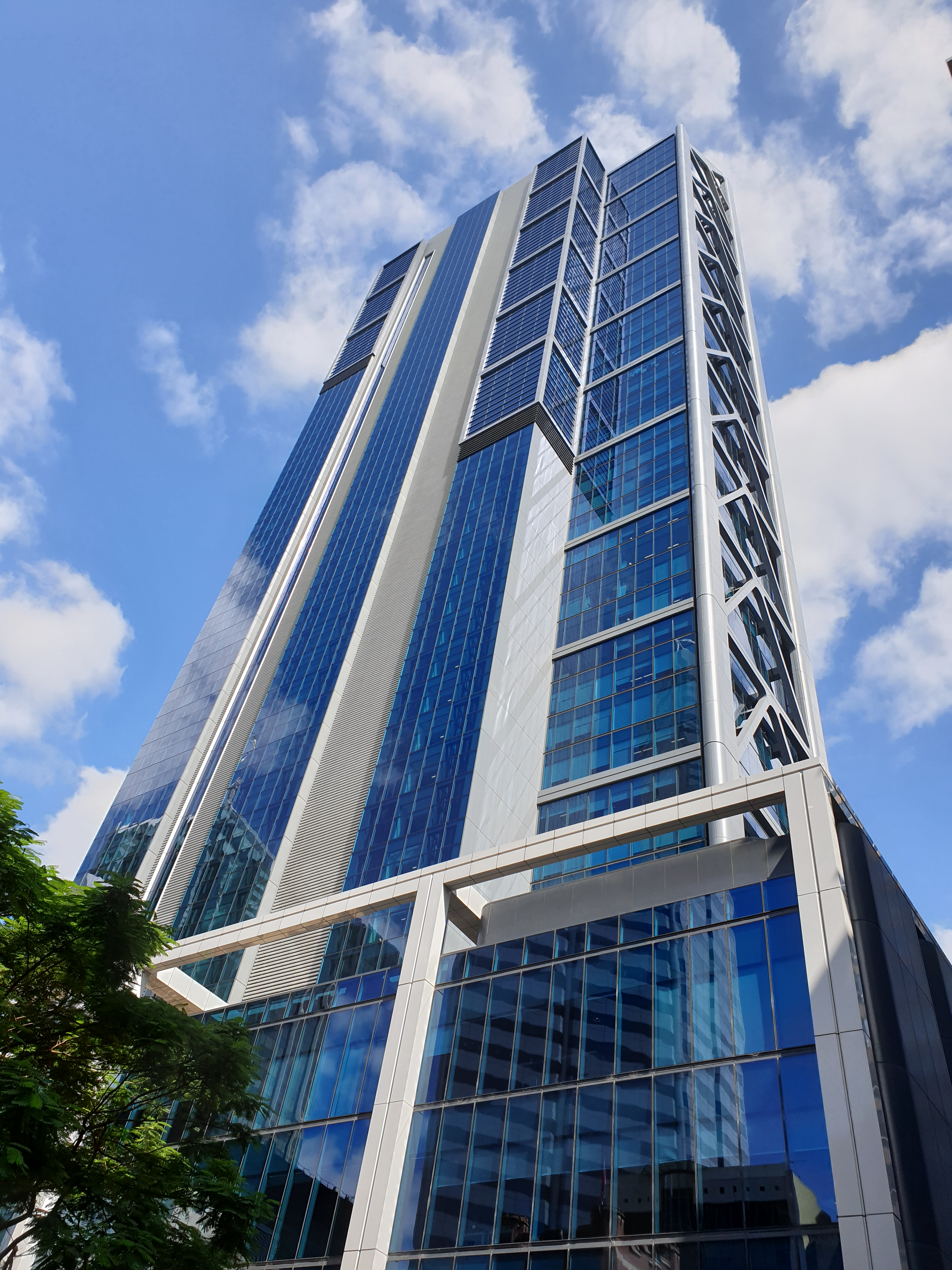
- BHP Office Tower in Perth, Western Australia
- Type: Public
- Traded as: ASX: BHP; S&P/ASX 50 component
- ISIN: AU000000BHP4
- Industry: Metals and mining
- Founded: 13 August 1885; 141 years ago (as the Broken Hill Proprietary Company); 29 June 2001 (as BHP Billiton)
- Headquarters: Melbourne, Victoria, Australia
- Area served: Global
- Key people: Ross McEwan (chair); Brandon Craig (CEO)
- Products: Iron ore, coal, copper, gold, nickel, uranium
- Revenue: ▼US$51.26 billion (2025)
- Operating income: ▲US$19.46 billion (2025)
- Net income: ▲US$11.14 billion (2025)
- Total assets: ▲US$108.8 billion (2025)
- Total equity: ▲US$52.22 billion (2025)
- Number of employees: 91,304 (2025)
- Website: www.bhp.com

The former BHP Billiton logo

BHP Group Limited, founded as the Broken Hill Proprietary Company, is an Australian multinational mining and metals corporation. BHP was established in August 1885 in Broken Hill and is headquartered in Melbourne, Victoria. The company specialises in mining and selling iron ore, copper and coal.

BHP Billiton was formed in June 2001 through the merger of the Australian Broken Hill Proprietary Company Limited (BHP) and the Anglo–Dutch Billiton plc, trading on both the Australian Securities Exchange and London Stock Exchange as a dual-listed company.

In 2015, some BHP Billiton assets were demerged and rebranded as South32, while a scaled-down BHP Billiton became BHP. In 2018, BHP Billiton Limited and BHP Billiton plc became BHP Group Limited and BHP Group plc, respectively. In January 2022, BHP relinquished its London Stock Exchange listing, becoming a solely Australian Securities Exchange-listed company.

As of 2026, BHP is the largest public company in Australia, and the largest mining company in the world, both as measured by market capitalisation. In 2025, the company's position in the Forbes Global 2000 was 125th.

== History ==
=== Billiton ===
The former Billiton logo

Billiton Maatschappij was founded 29 September 1860, when its articles of association were approved by a meeting of shareholders in the Groot Keizershof hotel in The Hague, Netherlands. Two months later, the company acquired mineral rights to the Belitung (formerly Billiton) and Bangka Islands in the Netherlands Indies archipelago off the eastern coast of Sumatra.

Billiton's initial ventures included tin and lead smelting in the Netherlands, followed in the 1940s by bauxite mining in Indonesia and Suriname. In 1970, Shell acquired Billiton. Billiton opened a tin smelting and refining plant in Phuket, Thailand, named Thaisarco (for Thailand Smelting And Refining Company, Limited).

In 1994, South Africa's Gencor acquired the mining division of Billiton excluding the downstream metal division. Billiton was divested from Gencor in 1997, and was amalgamated with Gold Fields in 1998. In 1997, Billiton plc became a constituent of the FTSE 100 Index and in 2001 Billiton plc merged with the Broken Hill Proprietary Company Limited (BHP) to form BHP Billiton.

=== Broken Hill Proprietary Company ===
The former Broken Hill Proprietary Company logo

The Broken Hill Proprietary Company Limited (BHP), also known by the nickname 'the Big Australian', was incorporated on 13 August 1885, operating the silver and lead mine at Broken Hill, in western New South Wales, Australia. The Broken Hill group floated on 10 August 1885. The first consignment of Broken Hill ore (48 tons, 5 cwt, 3 gr) was smelted at the Intercolonial Smelting and Refining Company's works at Spotswood, Victoria, a suburb of Melbourne. Historian Christopher Jay notes:

The resulting 35,605 ounces [1,107,400 grams] of silver raised a lot of interest when exhibited at the City of Melbourne Bank in Collins Street. Some sceptics asserted the promoters were merely using silver from somewhere else, to ramp up the shares.... Another shareholder, the dominating W. R. Wilson had had to lend William Jamieson, General Manager, a new suit so he could take the first prospectus, printed at Silverton near Broken Hill on 20 June 1885, to Adelaide to start the float process.

The geographic Broken Hill, for which the town was named, was discovered and named by Captain Charles Sturt, stirring great interest among prospectors. Nothing of note was discovered until 5 November 1883, when Charles Rasp, boundary rider for the surrounding Mount Gipps Station, pegged out a 16-hectare (40-acre) claim with contractors David James and James Poole.

Together with a half-dozen backers, including station manager George McCulloch (a young cousin of Victorian Premier Sir James McCulloch), Rasp formed the Broken Hill Company staking out the entire Hill. As costs mounted during the ensuing months of fruitless search, three of the original seven (now remembered as the Syndicate of Seven) sold their shares, so that, on the eve of the company's great success, there were nine shareholders, including Rasp, McCulloch, Philip Charly (aka Charley), David James, James Poole (five of the original syndicate of seven, which had previously included George Urquhart and G.A.M. Lind), Bowes Kelly, W. R. Wilson, and William Jamieson (who had bought shares from several of the founders).

John Darling, Jr. became a director of the company in 1892 and was chairman of directors from 1907 to 1914; he was succeeded by his son Harold Gordon Darling, initially as a director on his father's death, in 1914, and then as chairman from 1923 to 1950.

Strongly encouraged by the New South Wales Minister for Public Works, Arthur Hill Griffith, in 1915, the company ventured into steel manufacturing, with its operations based primarily at the Newcastle Steelworks. The decision to move from mining ore at Broken Hill to opening a steelworks at Newcastle was due to the technical limitations in recovering value from mining the lower-lying sulphide ores. The discovery of Iron Knob and Iron Monarch near the western shore of the Spencer Gulf in South Australia, combined with the refinement, by BHP metallurgists A. D. Carmichael and Leslie Bradford, of the froth flotation technique for separating zinc sulphides from the accompanying gangue and subsequent conversion (Carmichael–Bradford process) to oxides of the metal, allowed BHP to economically extract valuable metals from the heaps of tailings up to 12 metres (40 ft) high at the mine site. In 1942, the Imperial Japanese Navy targeted the BHP steelworks during the largely unsuccessful shelling of Newcastle.

Newcastle operations were closed in 1999, and a 64-tonne (70-short-ton) commemorative sculpture, The Muster Point, was installed on Industrial Drive, in the suburb of Mayfield, New South Wales. The long products side of the steel business was spun off to form OneSteel in 2000.

In the 1950s, BHP began petroleum exploration, which became an increasing focus following oil and natural gas discoveries in Bass Strait in the 1960s.

BHP began to diversify into a variety of mining projects overseas. Those included the Ok Tedi copper mine in Papua New Guinea, where the company was successfully sued by the indigenous inhabitants because of the environmental degradation caused by mining operations. BHP had better success with the giant Escondida copper mine in Chile, of which it owns 57.5%, and at the Ekati Diamond Mine in northern Canada, which BHP contracted for in 1996, began mining in 1998, and sold its 80% stake in to Dominion Diamond Corporation in 2013 as production declined.

=== BHP Billiton ===
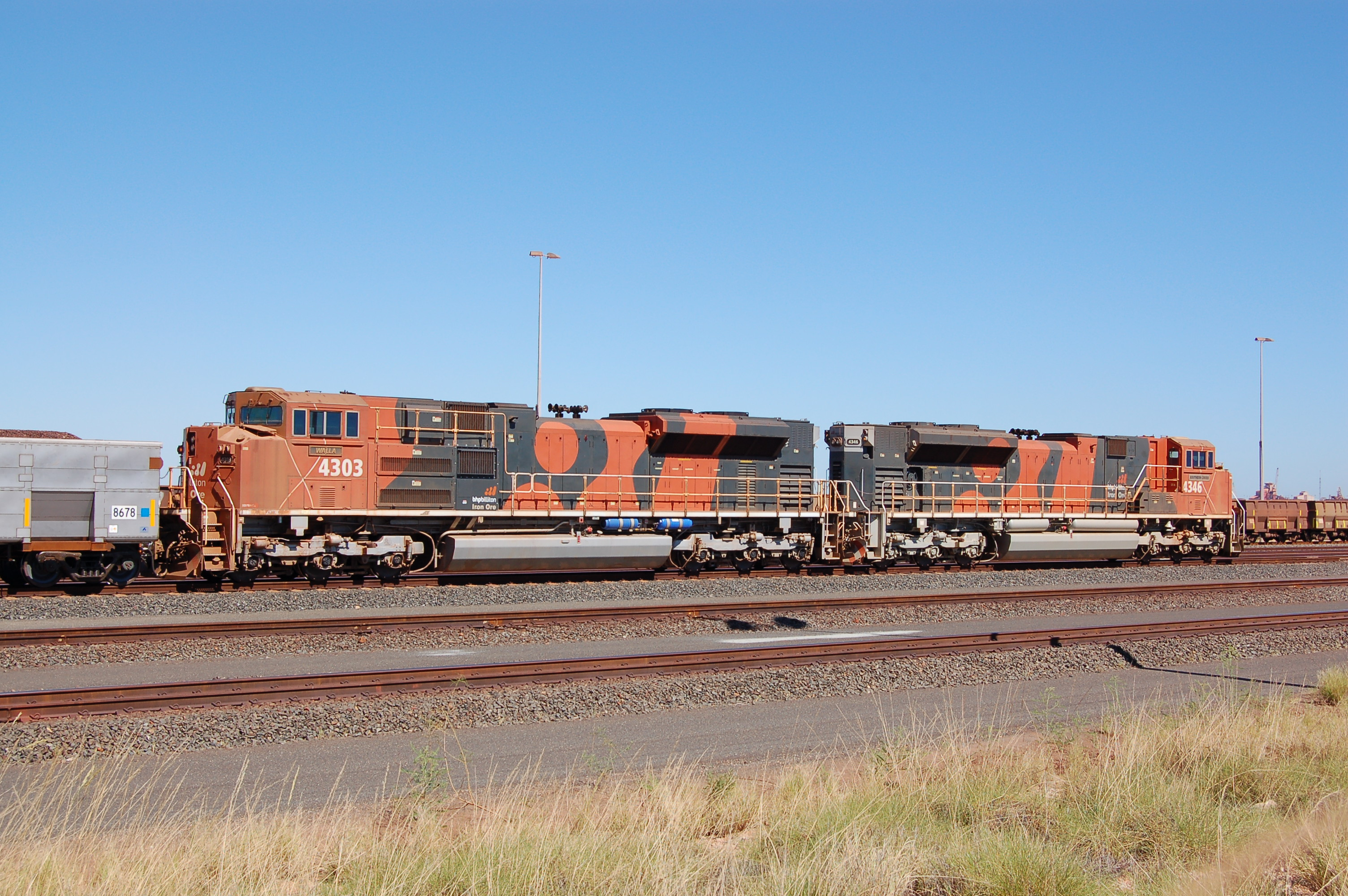
BHP Billiton Iron Ore diesel locomotives at Port Hedland

In June 2001, BHP merged with Billiton to form BHP Billiton.

BHP Billiton announced its intention to dispose of its transport assets that included 11 ships. In 2002, BHP Billiton's stevedoring operations in Australia and New Zealand were sold to Toll.

In July 2002, the flat steel products business was spun off as BHP Steel, which in 2003 became BlueScope.

In March 2005, BHP Billiton announced a US$7.3 billion agreed bid for WMC Resources, owners of the Olympic Dam copper, gold and uranium mine in South Australia, nickel operations in Western Australia and Queensland, and a Queensland fertiliser plant. The takeover achieved 90 per cent acceptance on 17 June 2005, and 100 per cent ownership was announced on 2 August 2005, achieved through compulsory acquisition of the remaining 10 per cent of the shares.

On 8 November 2007, BHP Billiton announced it was seeking to purchase rival mining group Rio Tinto in an all-share deal. The initial offer of 3.4 shares of BHP Billiton stock for each share of Rio Tinto was rejected by the board of Rio Tinto for "significantly undervaluing" the company. It was unknown at the time whether BHP Billiton would attempt to purchase Rio Tinto through some form of hostile takeover. A formal hostile bid of 3.4 BHP Billiton shares for each Rio Tinto share was announced on 6 February 2008; The bid was withdrawn 25 November 2008 due to the 2008 financial crisis.

As global nickel prices fell, on 25 November 2008, Billiton announced it would drop its A$66 billion takeover of rival Rio Tinto Group, stating that the "risks to shareholder value" would "increase" to "an unacceptable level" due to the 2008 financial crisis.

On 21 January 2009, BHP Billiton announced the Ravensthorpe Nickel Mine in Western Australia would cease operations, ending shipments of ore from Ravensthorpe to the Yabulu nickel plant in Queensland Australia. Yabulu refinery was subsequently sold to Queensland billionaire Clive Palmer, becoming the Palmer Nickel and Cobalt Refinery. The Pinto Valley mine in the United States was also closed. Mine closures and general scaling back during the 2008 financial crisis accounted for 6,000 employee lay offs.

On 9 December 2009, as the nickel market became saturated by both spiraling economics and cheaper extraction methods, BHP Billiton sold its Ravensthorpe Nickel Mine – which had cost A$2.4 billion to build – First Quantum Minerals for US$340 million.. Ravensthorpe cost BHP US$3.6 billion in write-downs when it was shut in January 2009 after less than a year of production.

In January 2010, following the BHP Billiton purchase of Athabasca Potash for US$320 million, The Economist reported that, by 2020, BHP Billiton could produce approximately 15 per cent of the world demand for potash.

In August 2010, BHP Billiton made a hostile takeover bid worth US$40 billion for PotashCorp. The bid came after BHP's first bid, made on 17 August, was rejected as being undervalued. This acquisition marked a major strategic move by BHP outside hard commodities and commenced the diversification of its business away from resources with high exposure to carbon price risk, like coal, petroleum and iron ore. The takeover bid was opposed by the Government of Saskatchewan under Premier Brad Wall. On 3 November, Canadian Industry Minister Tony Clement announced the preliminary rejection of the deal under the Investment Canada Act, giving BHP Billiton 30 days to refine their deal before a final decision was made; BHP withdrew its offer on 14 November 2010. Canada's decision to block the deal was generally viewed as surprising by the global investment community.

On 22 February 2011, BHP Billiton announced that it had paid $4.75 billion in cash to Chesapeake Energy for its Fayetteville shale assets, which include 197,000 hectares (487,000 acres) of mineral rights leases and 680 kilometres (420 mi) of pipeline located in north central Arkansas. The wells on the mineral leases are currently producing about 11.8 million cubic metres (415 million cubic feet) of natural gas per day. BHP Billiton planned to spend $800 million to $1 billion a year over 10 years to develop the field and triple production.

On 14 July 2011, BHP Billiton announced it would acquire Petrohawk Energy of the United States for approximately $12.1 billion in cash, considerably expanding its shale natural gas resources in an offer of $US38.75 per share.

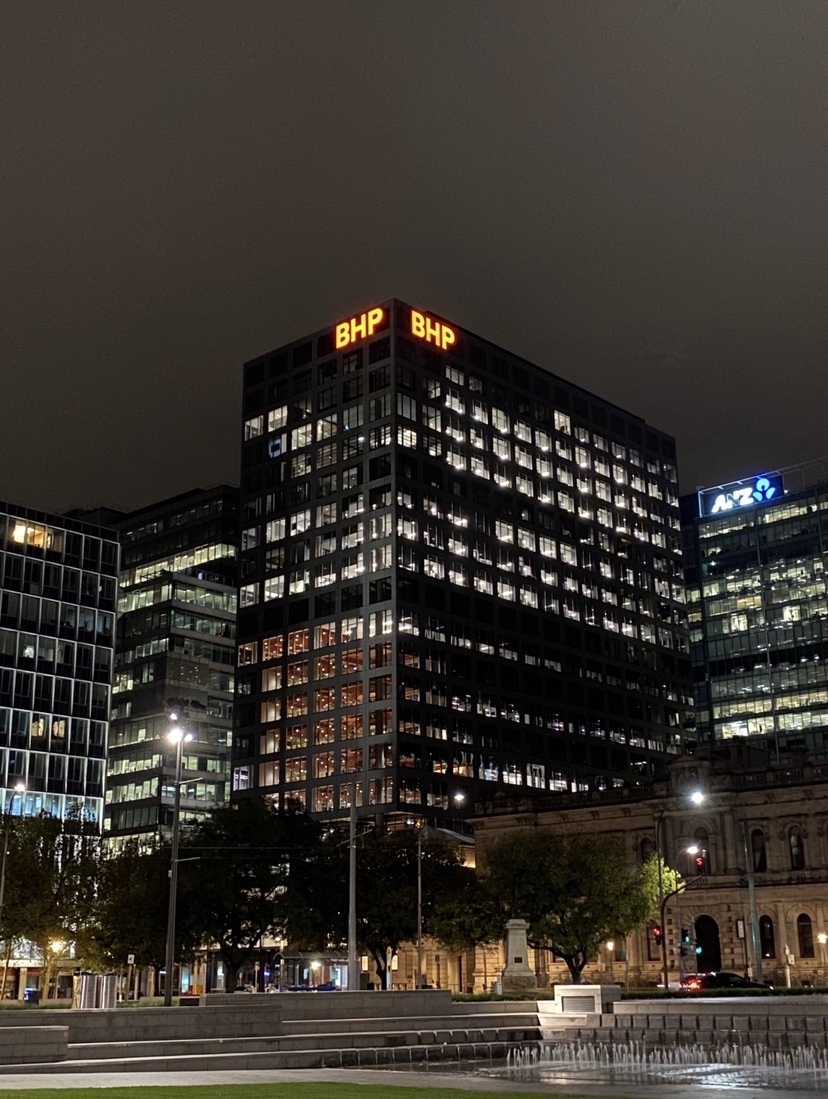
BHP office tower in Adelaide

On 22 August 2012, BHP Billiton announced it was delaying its US$20 billion Olympic Dam copper mine expansion project in South Australia to study less capital intensive options, deferring its dual harbour strategy at West Australian Iron Ore and slowing down its Potash growth option in Canada. The company simultaneously announced a freeze on approving any major new expansion projects.

Days after announcing the Olympic Dam pull-out, BHP Billiton announced that it was selling its Yeelirrie Uranium Project to Canadian Cameco for a fee of around $430 million. The sale was part of a broader move to step away from resource expansion in Australia.

On 19 August 2014, BHP Billiton announced it would create an independent global metals and mining company based on a selection of its aluminium, coal, manganese, nickel, and silver assets. The newly formed entity, named South32, was subsequently demerged with listings on the Australian Securities Exchange the JSE and the London Stock Exchange.

In 2015, BHP Billiton spun off a number of its subsidiaries in South Africa and Southern Africa to form a new company known as South32.

BHP Billiton agreed to pay a fine of $25 million to the United States Securities and Exchange Commission in 2015 in connection with violations of the Foreign Corrupt Practices Act related to its "hospitality program" at the 2008 Summer Olympics in Beijing. BHP Billiton invited 176 government and state-owned-enterprise officials to attend the Games on an all-expenses-paid package. While BHP Billiton claimed to have compliance processes in place to avoid conflicts of interest, the SEC found that BHP Billiton had invited officials from at least four countries where BHP Billiton had interests in influencing the officials' decisions (Congo, Guinea, Philippines and Burundi).

Towards the end of 2016 BHP Billiton indicated it would expand its petroleum business and make new investments in the sector. In February 2017, BHP Billiton announced a $2.2 billion investment in the new BPMad Dog oil field platform in the Gulf of Mexico. During the same year, as part of their plan to increase productivity at the Escondida mine in Chile, which is the world's biggest copper mine, BHP Billiton attempted to get workers to accept a 4-year pay freeze, a 66% reduction in the end-of-conflict bonus offering, and increased shift flexibility. This resulted in a major workers' strike and forced the company to declare force majeure on two shipments, which drove copper prices up by 4%.

In April 2017 activist hedge fund manager Elliott Advisors proposed a plan for BHP Billiton to spin off its American petroleum assets and significantly restructure the business, including the scrapping of its dual Sydney-London listing, suggesting shares be offered only in the United Kingdom, while leaving its headquarters and tax residences in Australia where shares would trade as depository instruments. At the time of the correspondence Elliott held about 4.1 per cent of the issued shares in London-listed BHP Billiton plc, worth $3.81 billion. Australia's government warned it would block moves to shift BHP Billiton's stock listing from Australia to the United Kingdom. Australian Treasurer Scott Morrison said the move would be contrary to the country's national interest and would breach government orders mandating a listing on the Australian Securities Exchange. BHP Billiton dismissed the plan saying the costs and risks of Elliott's proposal outweighed any potential benefits.

=== BHP ===
In May 2017, with much of the former Billiton assets having been disposed of, BHP Billiton began to rebrand itself as BHP, at first in Australia and then globally. It replaced the slogan "The Big Australian" with "Think Big", with an advertising campaign rolling out in mid May 2017.

In August 2017, BHP announced that it would sell off its US shale oil and gas business. In July 2018, the company agreed to sell its shale assets to BP for $10.5 billion. BHP indicated its intention to return funds to investors. On 29 September 2018, BHP completed the sale of its Fayetteville Onshore US gas assets to a wholly owned subsidiary of Merit Energy Company.

In August 2021, BHP announced plans to exit the oil and gas industry by merging its hydrocarbon business with Woodside Energy, Australia's largest independent gas producer. It also announced its intention to delist from the London Stock Exchange and consolidate on the Australian Securities Exchange. This occurred in January 2022. In April 2023, BHP took over Oz Minerals in a $9.6 billion deal.

BHP made an offer to acquire Anglo American for £31 billion in April 2024; however, the offer was rejected by Anglo American as "highly unattractive". A revised offer was also rejected in May 2024.

In July 2024, BHP and Lundin Mining agreed to jointly acquire 100% of Filo Corp. through a Canadian plan of arrangement. BHP and Lundin Mining also agreed to form a 50/50 joint venture to hold the Filo del Sol (FDS) and Josemaria projects.

In December 2025, BHP agreed to sell a stake in the inland power network used by its Western Australia iron-ore business to BlackRock's Global Infrastructure Partners for US$2 billion. The deal was expected to free up capital for BHP's investments to increase copper production and branch out into potash. Pending regulatory approval, completion of the deal is expected by 30 June 2026.

In March 2026, BHP announced it had appointed Brendon Craig as its new chief executive. Craig will take over the role from 1 July 2026 from Mike Henry.

== Corporation ==
From June 2001 to January 2022, BHP was a dual-listed company: the Australian BHP Billiton Limited and the British BHP Billiton plc were separately listed with separate shareholder bodies, while conducting business as one operation with identical boards of directors and a single management structure. BHP Billiton Limited and BHP Billiton plc were renamed BHP Group Limited and BHP Group plc, respectively, on 19 November 2018. On 31 January 2022, BHP unified the structure, after which BHP Group plc became a subsidiary of BHP Group Limited, the ultimate parent company of the group. BHP Group plc has since been renamed BHP Group (UK) Ltd. The headquarters of BHP Group Limited and the global headquarters of the group are located in Melbourne, Australia.

BHP Group Limited has its primary listing on the Australian Securities Exchange, an international secondary listing on the London Stock Exchange and a secondary listing on the Johannesburg Stock Exchange. It is also listed on the New York Stock Exchange in the form of American depositary receipts, with each American depositary share representing two ordinary shares. Its shares trade on the following exchanges:

- BHP Group Limited
  - Australia (ASX: BHP)
  - UK (LSE: BHP)
  - South Africa (JSE: BHG)
  - US (NYSE: BHP, American depositary receipts)

=== Senior management ===
In 1998, BHP hired American Paul Anderson to restructure the company. Anderson successfully completed the four-year project with a merger between BHP and London-based Billiton. In July 2002, Brian Gilbertson of Billiton was appointed CEO, but resigned after just six months, citing irreconcilable differences with the board.

Upon Gilbertson's departure in early 2003, Chip Goodyear was appointed the new CEO. Goodyear retired on 30 September 2007 and was succeeded by Marius Kloppers. Following Kloppers' tenure, Andrew Mackenzie, chief executive of Non-Ferrous, assumed the role of CEO in 2013. Australia mining head Mike Henry succeeded Mackenzie on 1 January 2020. In March 2026, BHP announced that Brandon Craig, then president of its Americas business, would succeed Henry as CEO and a director from 1 July 2026. Henry remained CEO to 30 June 2026 and was to support the transition until his employment ended on 30 November 2026.

Ross McEwan has been chair since 31 March 2025, succeeding Ken MacKenzie, who had chaired the board since September 2017.

=== Business trends ===
BHP's financial year ends on 30 June. In FY2026, the year ended 30 June 2026, BHP reported record iron ore production and shipments at Western Australia Iron Ore and about 2 million tonnes of copper for a second consecutive year; copper generated the majority of Group Underlying EBITDA for the first time. The key trends for BHP are (as of the financial year ending 30 June):

Financial year	Revenue (US$ billion)	Underlying EBITDA (US$ billion)	Profit from operations (US$ billion)	Attributable profit (US$ billion)	Net debt (US$ billion)
FY2021	56.9	35.1	25.5	11.3	4.1
FY2022	65.1	40.6	34.1	30.9	0.3
FY2023	53.8	28.0	22.9	12.9	11.2
FY2024	55.7	29.0	17.5	7.9	9.1
FY2025	51.3	26.0	19.5	9.0	12.9
FY2026	58.8	32.9	23.9	9.8	8.7

Underlying EBITDA is a non-IFRS measure. FY2021 and FY2022 revenue, Underlying EBITDA and profit from operations are for continuing operations; attributable profit includes discontinued operations, which contributed US$10.7 billion to FY2022.

== Operations ==
BHP has mining operations in Australia, North America, and South America.

The company has five primary operational units:

- Coal
- Copper
- Iron ore
- Potash
- Nickel

The company's mines are as follows:

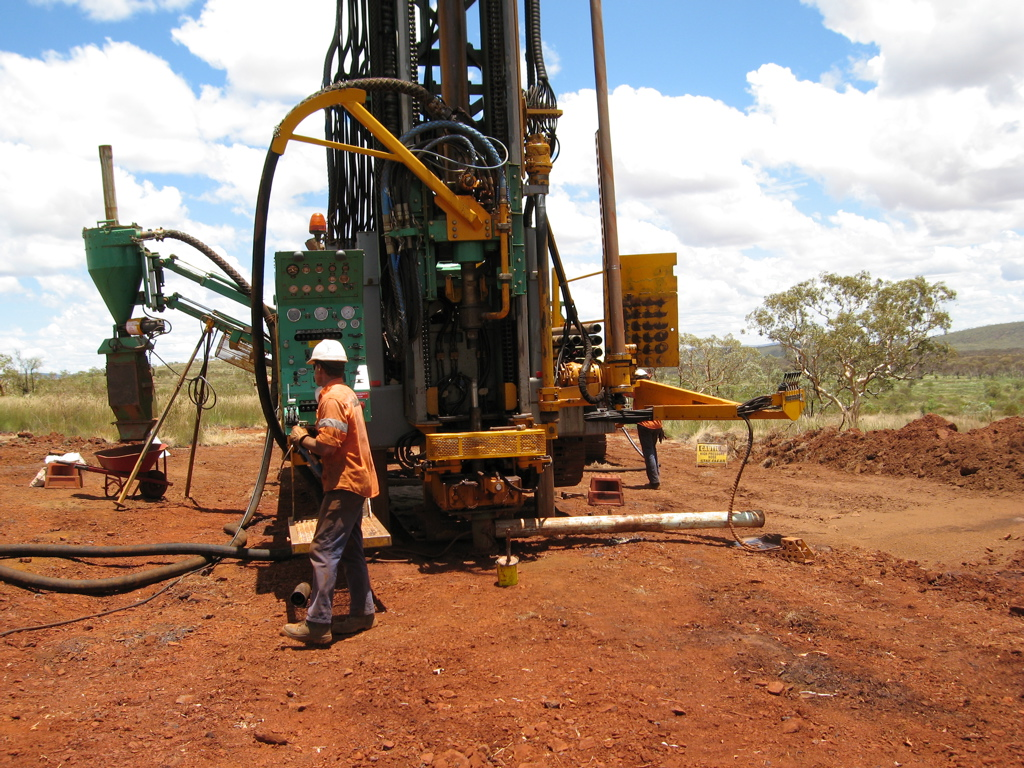
Drill rig at Area C mine, near Newman, Western Australia.

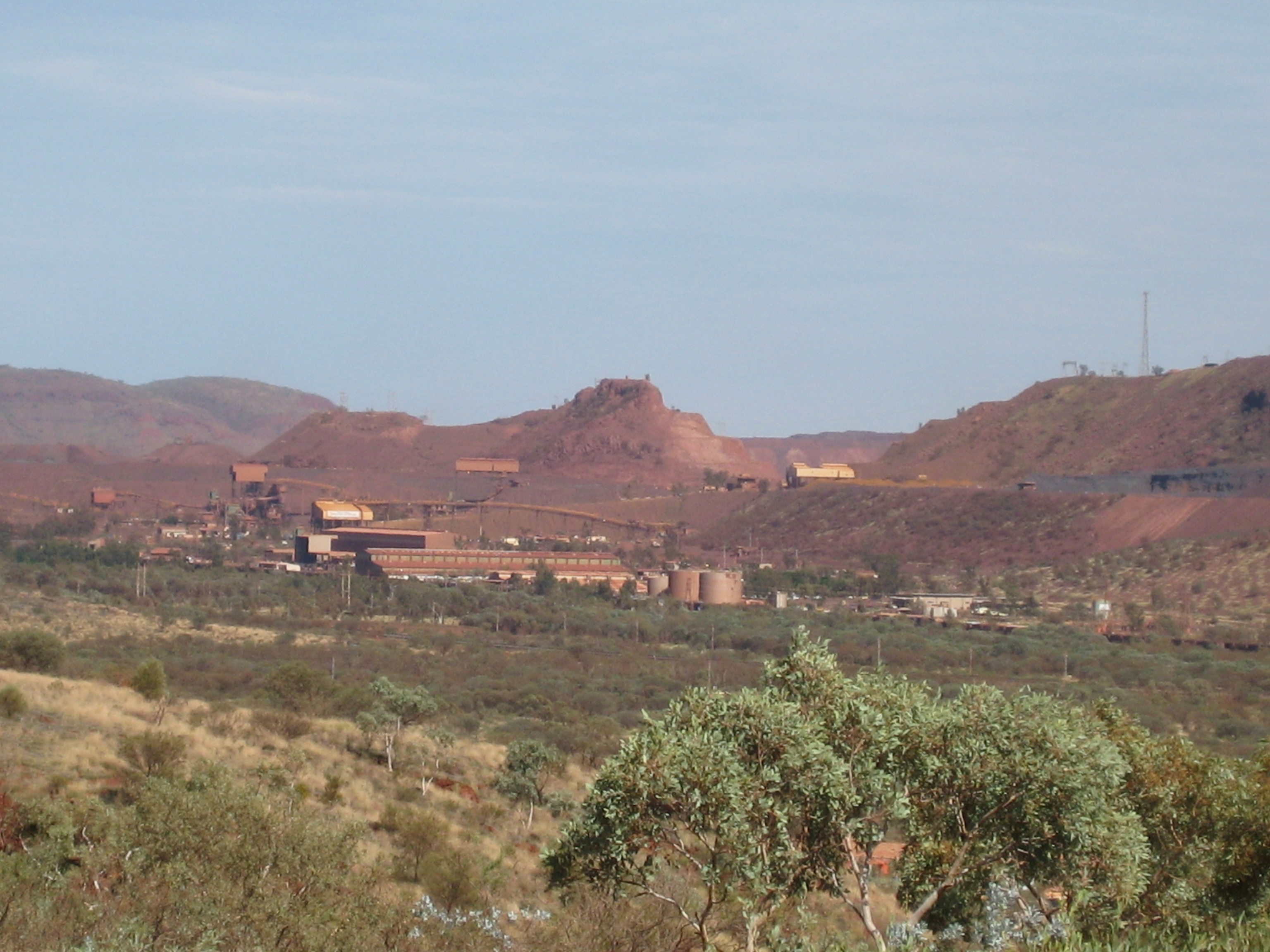
Process facility at Mount Whaleback mine, Western Australia.

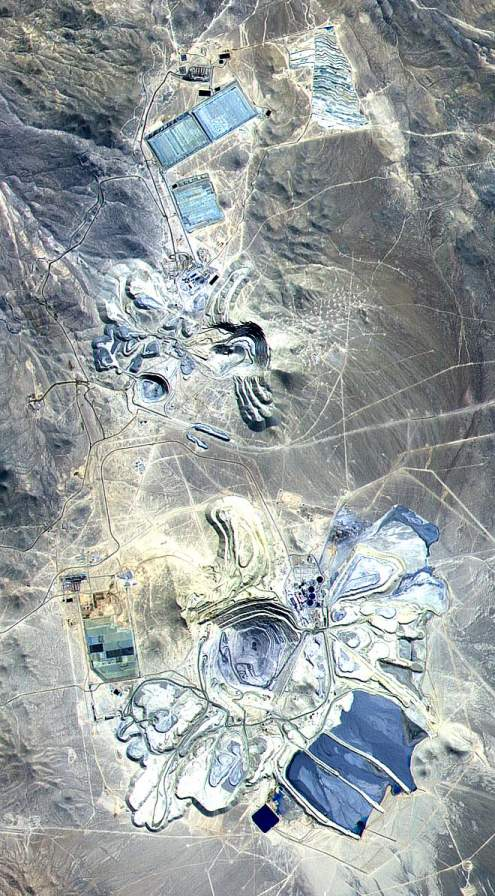
False colour satellite image of Escondida mine, Chile, courtesy of NASA

=== Australia ===
==== New South Wales ====
- Mount Arthur coal mine

==== Queensland ====
- Broadmeadow (50%) BHP Mitsubishi Alliance
- Goonyella (50%) BHP Mitsubishi Alliance
- Hay Point coal terminal
- Peak Downs (50%) BHP Mitsubishi Alliance
- Saraji (50%) BHP Mitsubishi Alliance
- Caval Ridge (50%) BHP Mitsubishi Alliance

==== South Australia ====
- Carrapateena
- Olympic Dam
- Prominent Hill

==== Western Australia ====
- Area C mine
- Eastern Range mine
- Jimblebar mine
- Kalgoorlie
- Kambalda
- Kwinana
- Leinster
- Mount Keith
- Mount Whaleback
- Nickel West
- Nimingarra Iron Ore Mine, Jointly owned with Itochu and Mitsubishi)
- North West Shelf Venture, (16.67% LNG phase, 8.33% domestic gas phase.)
- Orebodies 18, 23 and 25 mine
- Port Hedland
- South Flank mine
- Yandi mine
- Yarrie mine

=== Brazil ===
- Samarco: a joint-venture with Vale (50% ownership each). The project led to the worst environmental disaster in the history of mining in Brazil: the collapse of two iron ore tailings dams in Bento Rodrigues, a subdistrict of Mariana.

=== Canada ===
- Jansen potash development project, Saskatchewan

=== Chile ===
- Pampa Norte
  - Cerro Colorado ("temporary closure" since 2023)
  - Spence
- Minera Escondida
  - Escondida
- Filo Corp
  - Filo del Sol (planned)

=== Peru ===
- Antamina (non-operated asset)

== BHP Foundation ==
The BHP Foundation is a philanthropic organisation funded by BHP, which as of October 2023 was funding 38 projects in 65 countries. Its Australian programs are focused on Indigenous Australian self-determination, and young people. One of its partner organisations is Reconciliation Australia.

== Environmental issues ==
=== Climate damage ===
BHP is listed as one of the 90 fossil fuel extraction and marketing companies responsible for two-thirds of global greenhouse gas emissions since the beginning of the industrial age. Its cumulative emissions as of 2010 have been estimated at 7,606 MtCO_{2}e, representing 0.52% of global industrial emissions between 1751 and 2010, ranking it the 19th-largest corporate polluter. According to BHP management 10% of these emissions are from direct operations, while 90% come from products sold by the company. BHP has been voluntarily reporting its direct GHG emissions since 1996. In 2013, it was criticised for lobbying against carbon pricing in Australia. In June 2024, BHP announced that the company was on track to meet its 30% emissions reduction target by 2030 from 2020 baseline levels and did not rule out using carbon offsets as part of its $4 billion plan to meet the target.

BHP reported total CO2e emissions (Direct + Indirect) for the twelve months ending 30 June 2020 at 15,800 Kt.

BHP's annual Total CO2e emissions (Direct + Indirect) (in kilotonnes)
Jun 2015	Jun 2016	Jun 2017	Jun 2018	Jun 2019	Jun 2020
38,300	18,000	16,300	17,000	15,800	15,800

=== Ok Tedi environmental disaster ===
The Ok Tedi environmental disaster caused severe harm to the environment along the Ok Tedi River and the Fly River in the Western Province of Papua New Guinea between around 1984 and 2013. In 1999, BHP reported that 90 million tons of mine waste was annually discharged into the river for more than ten years and destroyed downstream villages, agriculture and fisheries. Mine wastes were deposited along 1,000 km (620 mi) of the Ok Tedi and the Fly River below its confluence with the Ok Tedi, and over an area of 100 km^{2} (39 sq mi). BHP's CEO, Paul Anderson, said that the Ok Tedi Mine was "not compatible with our environmental values and the company should never have become involved." In the 1990s the communities of the lower Fly Region, including the Yonggom people, sued BHP and received US$28.6 million in an out-of-court settlement. Experts predict that it will take 300 years to clean up the toxic contamination.

=== Bento Rodrigues dam collapse ===
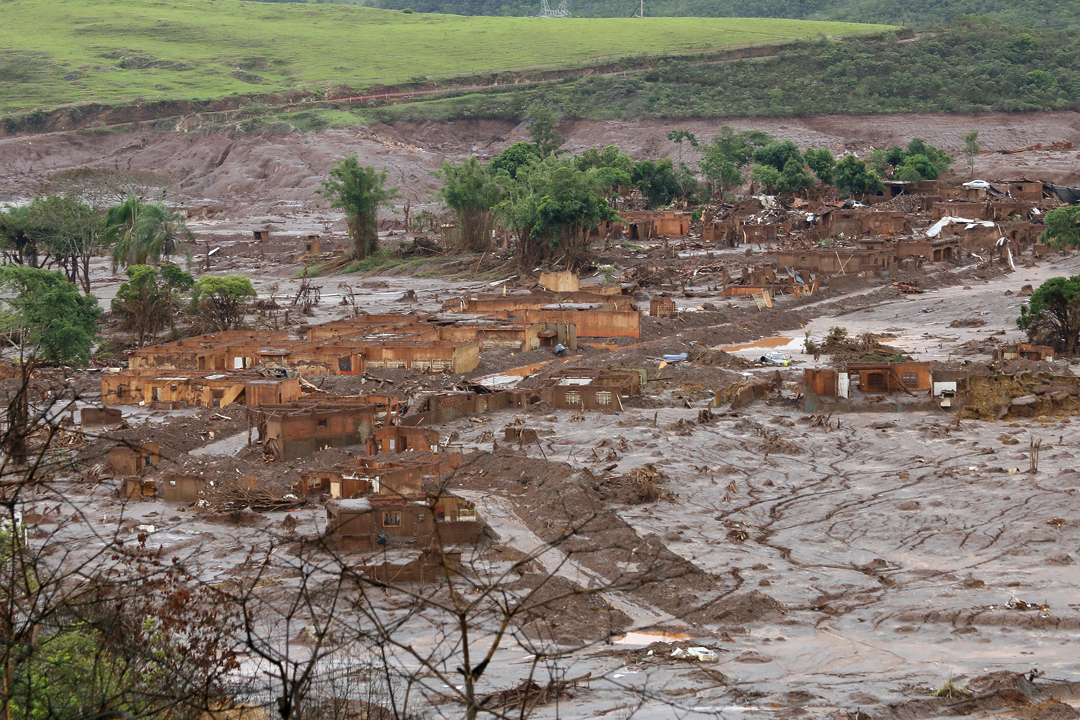
A village flooded in the Bento Rodrigues dam disaster (2015). The dam was a property of Samarco, a joint venture between Vale and BHP Billiton.

In 2015, the company was involved in the Bento Rodrigues tailings dam collapse, the worst environmental disaster in the history of the state of Minas Gerais, Brazil. On 5 November 2015, an iron ore mine tailings dam near Mariana, south-eastern Brazil, owned and operated by Samarco, a subsidiary of BHP and Vale, suffered a catastrophic failure, devastating the nearby town of Bento Rodrigues with the mudflow, killing 19 people, injuring more than 50 and causing enormous ecological damage, and threatening life along the Rio Doce and the Atlantic Ocean near the mouth of the Rio Doce. An investigation found the collapse was due to construction and design flaws.

In June 2018, Samarco, Vale and BHP signed an agreement for the Brazilian government to drop a $7 billion civil lawsuit against the mining companies and allow two years for the companies to address the greater US$55 billion civil lawsuit brought by Brazil's federal prosecutors seeking social, environmental and economic compensation. In August 2018, BHP settled a class action suit in the US for US$50 million, with no admission of liability. At the same time, it was facing a class action lawsuit from shareholders in Australia related to the dam failure and losses incurred by shareholders following company disclosures to the market regarding the safety of the dam.

In November 2018, UK-based legal firm SPG Law, now Pogust Goodhead, filed a US$5 billion group action in the High Court of Justice at Liverpool under Brazilian law against BHP Billiton on behalf of 235,000 Brazilian individuals and organisations, including municipal governments, utility companies, indigenous tribes and the Catholic Church. BHP continues to deny the claim in its entirety. In August 2025, BHP Group and Vale offered US$1.4 billion to settle the case. On 14 November 2025, High Court judge Finola O'Farrell ruled BHP strictly liable for the disaster, citing negligence, technical warnings and lack of essential studies, which permitted the height of the dam to increase beyond safe levels. The group stated it intends to appeal over the decision.

=== Exploitation of aquifers in Atacama Desert ===
BHP has been accused of perpetrating irregularities with respect to drawing waters above the granted limit from the aquifers. Due to which the water table has dropped significantly, making land-based livelihoods less viable for people of the community, many of whom have been forced to relocate to urban areas. In January 2021, the Supreme Court of Chile validated the objections of local indigenous tribes about BHP's water usage and impacts on wetland areas. Later in July, the same court ordered BHP to begin the application process for Cerro Colorado operating permits from scratch. In 2023 the mine was closed as its permit expired to extract water from the bofedal-hosting aquifer of Lagunillas expired and was not renewed. BHP subsidiary Pampa Norte plans to start works in 2028, with the intention of reopening Cerro Colorado around 2030.

Starting in 2022 indigenous Atacameño people sued BHP's Minera Escondida, Albemarle and Minera Zaldívar over damages to the Monturaqui-Negrillar-Tilopozo Aquifer. The lawsuit was joined by the Chilean state's Consejo de Defensa del Estado. Minera Escondida argued for its part that any effects of its water extraction have not had time to manifest downstream at the observation sites, due to the slow movement of groundwater, and hence that it was the extraction of the other two companies that had impacted it. The lawsuit ended in December 2024 in a conciliation agreement in which BHP's Minera Escondida and the other two companies were to compensate economically, socially and environmentally the indigenous Comunidad de Peine as well as paying for damages to the meadows of Tilopozo and the lakes of La Punta and La Brava.

== Cultural issues ==
From 2019 to 2021, BHP registered six cases of sexual assault and 73 cases of sexual harassment. A survey of 425 workers conducted by The Western Mine Workers' Alliance, showed that two-thirds of female respondents had experienced verbal sexual harassment while working in the FIFO mining industry, with 36% of women and 10% of men having experienced some form of harassment in the last 12 months. In response, BHP terminated or otherwise permanently removed forty eight workers from its sites.

== Other significant accidents ==
Bad weather caused a BHP Billiton helicopter to crash in Angola on 16 November 2007, killing the helicopter's five occupants. The deceased were: BHP Billiton Angola Chief Operating Officer David Hopgood (Australian), Angola Technical Services Operations Manager Kevin Ayre (British), Wild Dog Helicopters pilot Kottie Breedt (South African), Guy Sommerfield (British) of MMC and Louwrens Prinsloo (Namibian) of Prinsloo Drilling. The helicopter crashed approximately 80 kilometres (50 mi) from the Alto Cuilo diamond exploration camp in Lunda Norte, northeastern Angola. BHP Billiton responded by suspending operations in the country.

== See also ==
- Mining in Australia
