= Shay Gap, Western Australia =

Former town in Western Australia

Shay Gap
- Town
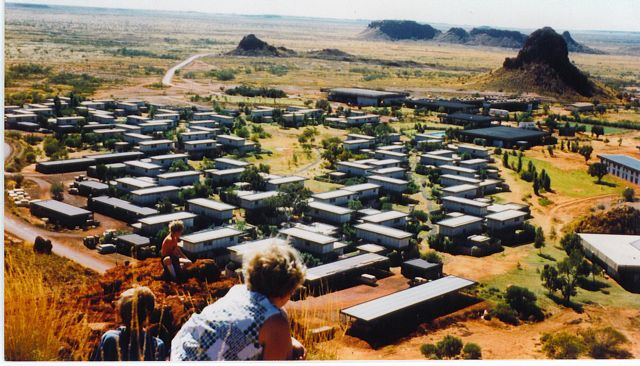
- Shay Gap in 1975

- Interactive map of Shay Gap
- Coordinates: 20°29′44″S 120°09′59″E
- Country: Australia
- State: Western Australia
- LGA: Shire of East Pilbara
- Established: 1972
- Abolished: 1994

Government
  - State electorate: Pilbara
- Elevation: 175 m (574 ft)

Population
  - Total: 0
- Time zone: UTC+8 (AWST)

Shay Gap was an iron ore mining town in the Pilbara region of Western Australia, 1,335 kilometres (830 mi) north-northeast of Perth and 165 kilometres (103 mi) east of Port Hedland. Shay Gap was formally gazetted as a town in 1972.

Shay Gap was named after a pass of the same name in the hills nearby. The name of the pass has been shown on maps since 1957, and it is believed to have been named after a blackbirder, Robert Shea, part-owner of the pearler Seaspray. Shea, along with his mate Samuel Miller, was killed in November 1872 by "absconding" indentured workers while on an expedition to Mukkine (now Muccanoo Pool on Muccan Station), on the De Grey River to "recover the services of some native divers who had broken faith with him".

Shay Gap was a company town, developed by Mount Goldsworthy Mining Associates to service nearby iron ore mines. The town was designed in 1970 by Lawrence Howroyd, for whom it won an Award of Merit in the 1974 Prince Philip Prize for Australian Design. Iron ore production started in January 1973.

At its peak, the town had a population of over 850 people. Mining activities ceased on 10 December 1993 and the town was closed in February 1994. Buildings and structures were either sold, demolished or relocated to Yarrie.
