= Henry Walker Eltin =

Australian automotive, construction, and mining company

- Formerly: Henry Walker Group
- Type: Public
- Traded as: ASX: HWE
- Industry: Mining
- Founded: 1962
- Founder: Neville Walker; Frazer Henry
- Defunct: 2006
- Headquarters: Sydney, Australia
- Revenue: $1.1 billion (2003/04)
- Net income: $11 million (2003/04)
- Number of employees: 3,971 (June 2004)
- Website: www.hwe.com.au

Henry Walker Eltin was a diversified Australian company with interests in the automotive, construction and mining sectors. It was the first Northern Territory company listed on the Australian Securities Exchange.

== History ==
The history of Henry Walker Eltin can be traced back to 1962 when Henry Walker was founded as a civil engineering contractor by Neville Walker and Frazer Henry.

In the 1980s it diversified into the automotive sector with the Bridge Autos dealership in Darwin, Northern Territory that held franchises for the sale of Daewoos, Mercedes-Benzs and Toyotas.

It entered the contract mining sector in 1987. Eltin was established as an underground mining contractor in 1980. In May 1999 Henry Walker and Eltin merged to form Henry Walker Eltin. In April 2000, Simon Engineering was acquired.

In January 2005, HWE was placed in voluntary administration with EY as administrator. EY resigned the following day due to a conflict of interest with McGrathNicol appointed.

In March 2005 Simon Engineering was sold to Abigroup and the Northern Territory civil contracting business to Macmahon Holdings. In April 2005 Bridge Autos was sold to AP Eagers. In May 2005 the Western Australian civil construction business was sold to Clough.

In February 2006, the HWE Mining business was sold to Leighton Contractors marking the conclusion of the asset disposal program.
