= Goldsworthy, Western Australia =

Former town in Western Australia

Goldsworthy
- Town
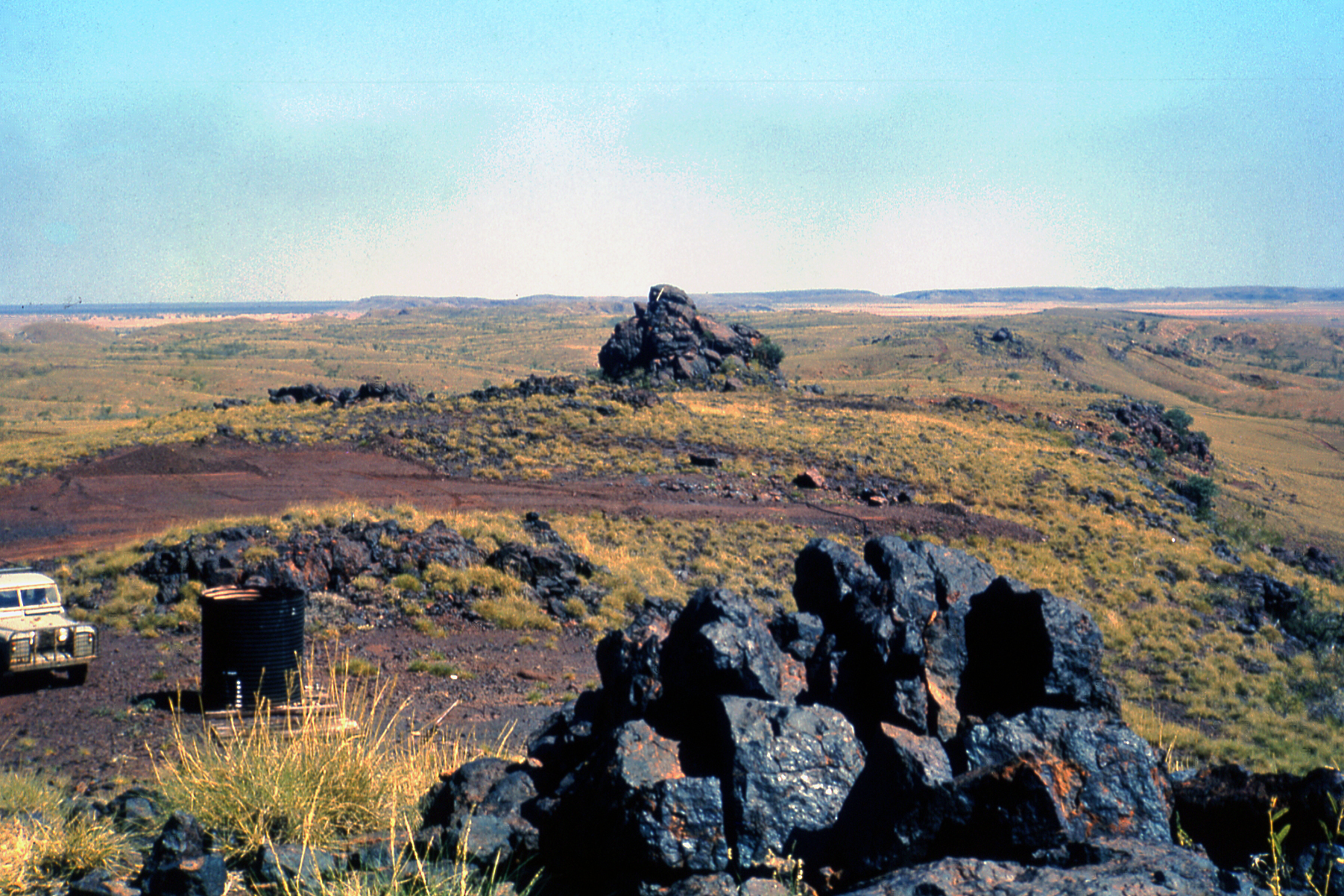
- 1964 photograph showing iron ore outcrops on the top of Mount Goldsworthy before mining commenced

- Interactive map of Goldsworthy
- Coordinates: 20°20′31″S 119°31′06″E
- Country: Australia
- State: Western Australia
- LGA: Shire of East Pilbara
- Location: 96 km (60 mi) E of Port Hedland; 1,340 km (830 mi) NNE of Perth
- Established: 1965

Government
  - State electorate: Pilbara
  - Federal division: Durack
- Elevation: 46 m (151 ft)

Goldsworthy (named after the geographical feature Mount Goldsworthy) is a former mining town in Western Australia, east of Port Hedland and located in the Shire of East Pilbara. It was the first iron ore mine in the Pilbara region of Western Australia.

== Early discoveries ==
The explorer Francis Thomas Gregory reported seeing iron ore in the region during his Pilbara explorations in late 1861 and the Government Geologist H.P. Woodward confirmed the discovery of iron ore there in 1890. In 1919 Government Geologist Andrew Gibb Maitland confirmed these deposits but at the time mining them was not an economically viable proposition.

In 1938 Geological Survey of Western Australia geologists Kevin Finucane and Robert Telford surveyed Mount Goldsworthy and reported preliminary estimates of more than 6,000,000 tons of iron ore at 65.66% iron. In the lead up to the Second World War, due to the classification of iron as a strategic material the Commonwealth of Australia placed an embargo on the export of ore. The export embargo was lifted in December 1960 and competition to develop the mine commenced in earnest with the government intending to issue an export licence for ore mined at the site.

Frank Thompson Jr, owner of Pardoo Station had established wells, windmills and paddocks in the area and also pegged mining leases there as they were on the southern end of the station, but he allowed these leases to lapse because of this embargo.

The granting of the export licence did not go without controversy. Ernie Mitchell, chairman of directors of an indigenous corporation known as the Pindan Group, called for an iron ore export licence to be issued to his organisation. Mitchell argued in a pamphlet issued in the early 1960s that:

The granting of an export licence [for iron ore from Mount Goldsworthy] to us, the only successful self-contained Aboriginal group in Australia, would go a long way towards silencing the many critics of Australia's policy towards the original Australians.

Furthermore: We do not ask for an export licence on terms different from those that would be applied to other persons or groups. We do ask that the following facts be considered:

1. We are lifetime residents of the district.
2. We have the mining skills, and the workforce necessary to handle the project.
3. We are familiar with the problems that may arise, and have experience of solving such problems in recent years. We have been basically responsible for producing many thousands of tons of valuable minerals.
4. We can make arrangements equivalent to those of any other sound business concern, and we have a pool of labour, resident in the district, and accustomed to working in the climatic and other arduous conditions of the Mount Goldsworthy area.
5. We are aware, as all Australians should be, that our country’s policy in New Guinea towards the natives, and in Australia towards us, has been vigorously attacked in the councils of the United Nations Organisation ... We feel to grant us, the Aboriginal people of the Pindan Group, an iron ore export licence, would go a long way towards convincing such critics of our Government's sincerity and goodwill towards us, and would be a major contribution to the realisation of our plans to raise our standards to the level of our white fellow Australians by enterprise and hard work. We do not seek charity.

== Early development of the mine ==
In February 1962, three international mining companies: the British-owned Consolidated Goldfields (Aust) Pty Ltd, Cyprus Mines Corporation of Los Angeles and Utah Construction & Mining Company of San Francisco, formed Mount Goldsworthy Mining Associates (GML). The consortium was granted an export licence in early 1963 to ship 4 million tonnes of iron ore per year from a port to be built at Finucane Island at Port Hedland, 100 km west.

The consortium signed a contract with Japanese steel mills in February 1965 with a stipulation that the first shipment of ore had to be made within 15 months.

Construction of the port and town commenced in February 1965 and the first rail-delivery of iron ore was made to Finucane Island on 1 December 1965. The first 24,900 tonnes of ore was loaded at Finucane Island onto Harvey S. Mudd on 26 June 1966. The mine was hit by Cyclone Amy in 1980 but it was rebuilt.

700 people lived in 200 houses at Goldsworthy at its peak. The mine at Goldsworthy was closed on 22 December 1982 and mining operations ceased at Shay Gap in 1993. The town was abandoned in 1992. Upon closure, all buildings were removed, all vegetation not indigenous to the local area was burnt, and the roads torn up. This was done in accordance with the government's policy of regrowth to avoid the occurrence of ghost towns.

Today, very little remains on the site to indicate that the town ever existed. The pit that was the mine still exists, but is flooded. The railway to other mines passes nearby, and there is a (solar powered) radio repeater site to service the railway. The street layout can still be seen from the air.

== Climate ==
Climate data for Goldsworthy
Month	Jan	Feb	Mar	Apr	May	Jun	Jul	Aug	Sep	Oct	Nov	Dec	Year
Record high °C (°F)	48.5 (119.3)	47.8 (118.0)	46.0 (114.8)	43.1 (109.6)	39.9 (103.8)	34.3 (93.7)	35.6 (96.1)	37.7 (99.9)	42.1 (107.8)	44.4 (111.9)	48.0 (118.4)	47.1 (116.8)	48.5 (119.3)
Mean daily maximum °C (°F)	39.6 (103.3)	38.8 (101.8)	38.7 (101.7)	36.5 (97.7)	31.6 (88.9)	28.3 (82.9)	28.0 (82.4)	30.5 (86.9)	34.3 (93.7)	37.6 (99.7)	39.5 (103.1)	40.4 (104.7)	35.3 (95.5)
Mean daily minimum °C (°F)	26.5 (79.7)	26.3 (79.3)	26.1 (79.0)	23.8 (74.8)	19.7 (67.5)	16.6 (61.9)	15.0 (59.0)	16.5 (61.7)	19.0 (66.2)	21.5 (70.7)	23.7 (74.7)	25.3 (77.5)	21.7 (71.1)
Record low °C (°F)	20.5 (68.9)	19.1 (66.4)	18.9 (66.0)	16.1 (61.0)	12.2 (54.0)	8.7 (47.7)	6.9 (44.4)	9.2 (48.6)	12.2 (54.0)	15.1 (59.2)	16.3 (61.3)	17.5 (63.5)	6.9 (44.4)
Average precipitation mm (inches)	67.6 (2.66)	93.9 (3.70)	57.9 (2.28)	15.0 (0.59)	23.1 (0.91)	19.0 (0.75)	9.8 (0.39)	3.9 (0.15)	1.3 (0.05)	2.5 (0.10)	2.3 (0.09)	28.0 (1.10)	329.7 (12.98)
Average precipitation days	6.3	8.0	4.3	1.5	2.1	1.9	1.0	0.4	0.2	0.2	0.3	2.5	25.7
Average relative humidity (%)	35	37	32	24	27	27	22	21	17	19	21	27	26

== Gallery ==
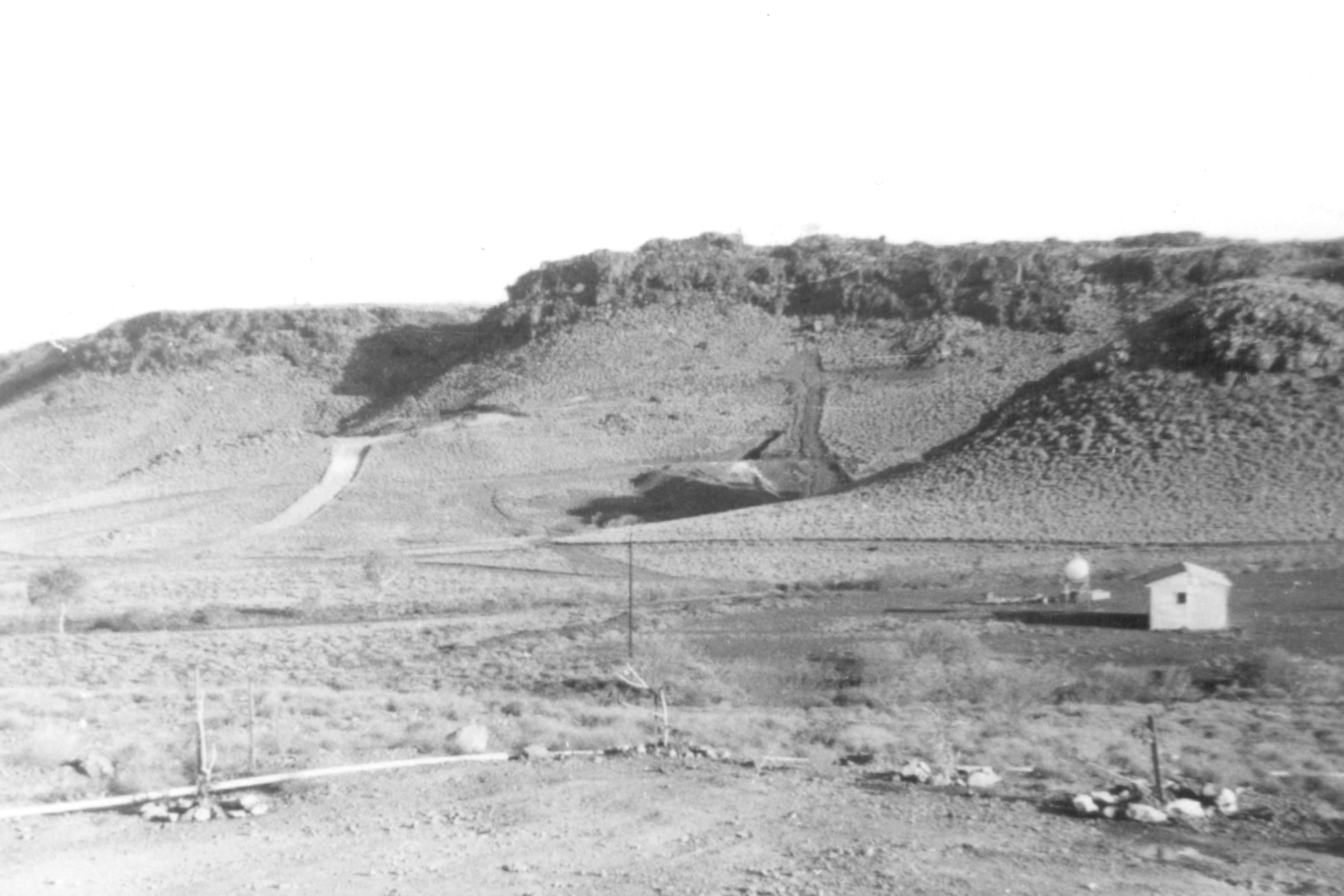
Mount Goldsworthy from the GML exploration camp – Christmas 1963

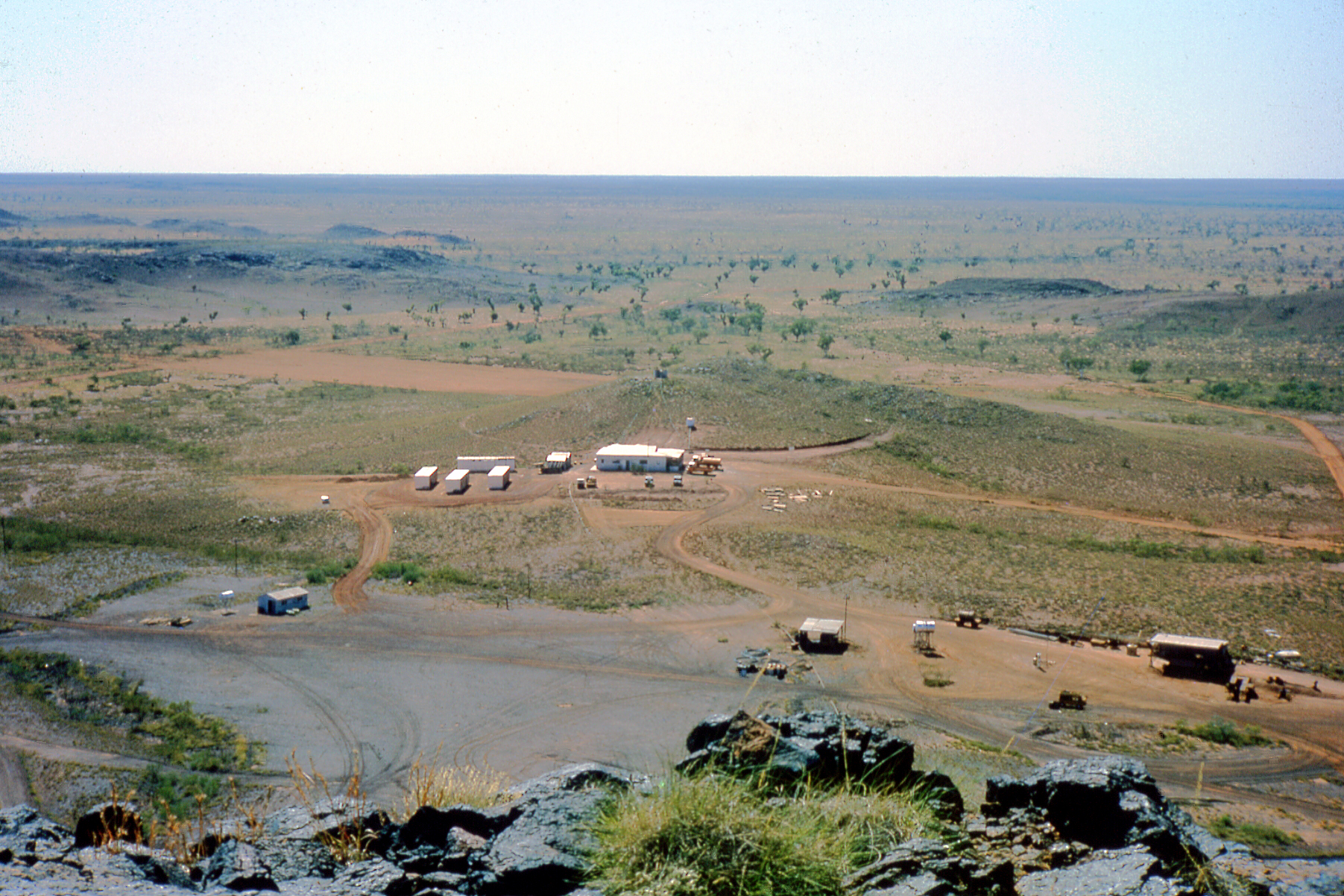
Original exploration camp. The "dongas" to accommodate extra staff during the "proving of reserves stage" were added in 1964.

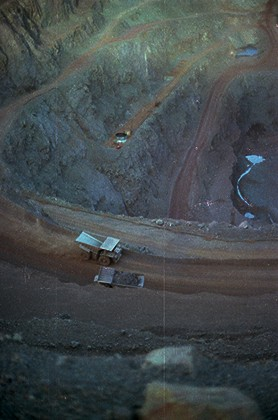
The pit looking eastwards in 1978

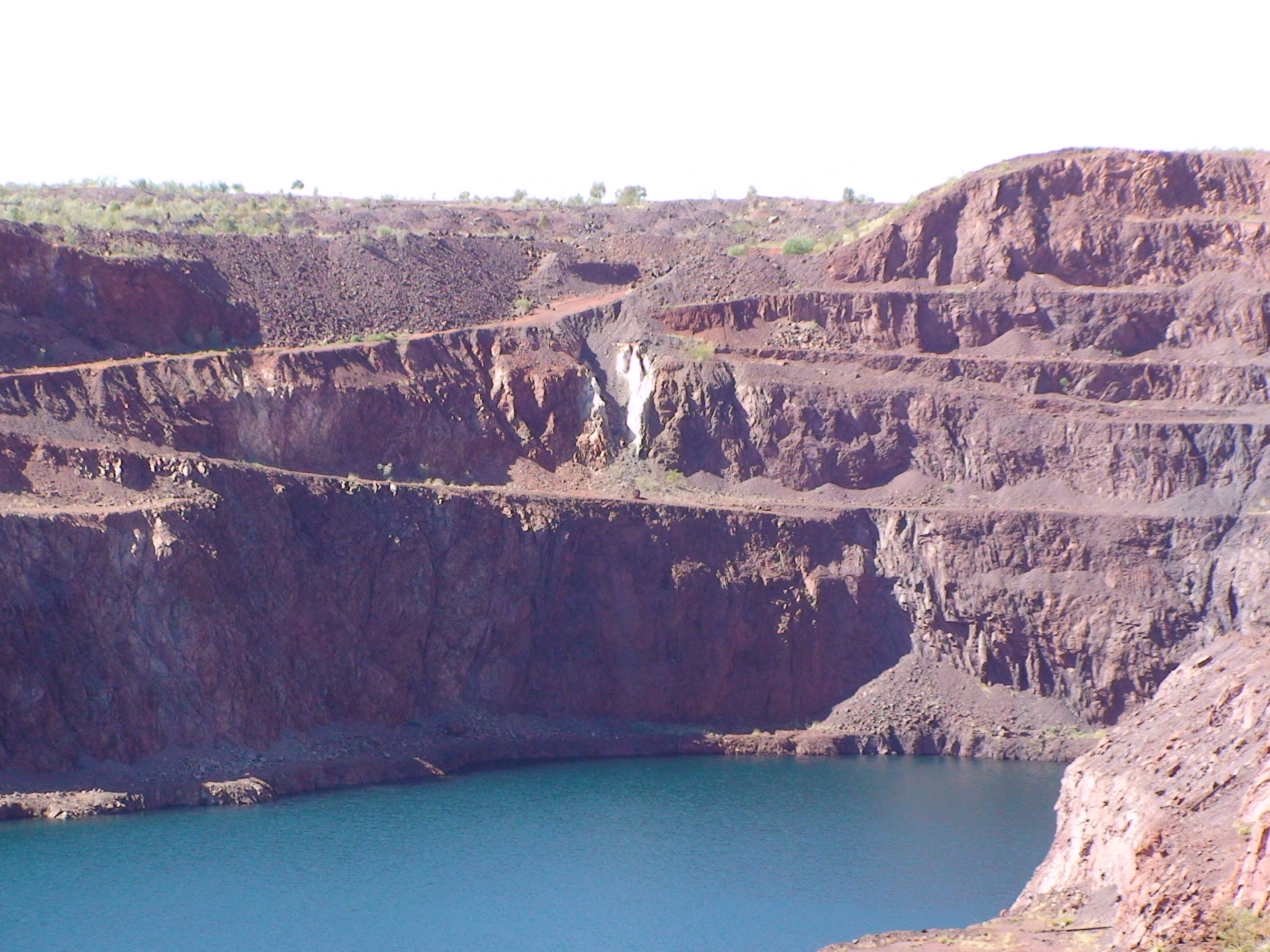
The abandoned pit at Mount Goldsworthy in 2008
