= Shire of East Pilbara =

Coordinates: 23°21′14″S 119°43′55″E

- Local government area
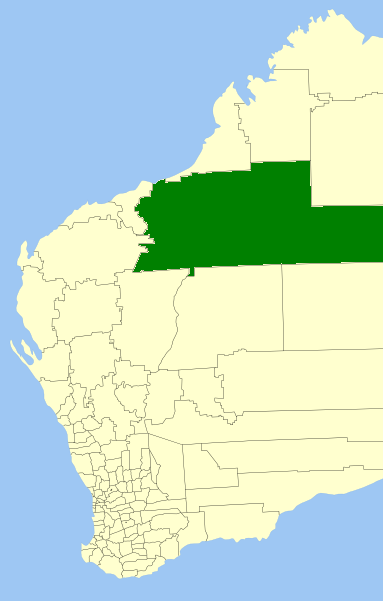
- Location in Western Australia

- Interactive map of Shire of East Pilbara
- Country: Australia
- State: Western Australia
- Region: Pilbara
- Established: 1972
- Council seat: Newman

Government
  - Shire president: Anthony Middleton
  - State electorate: Pilbara
  - Federal division: Durack

Area
  - Total: 372,571 km^{2} (143,850 sq mi)

Population
  - Total: 9,760 (LGA 2021)
- Website: Shire of East Pilbara
LGAs around Shire of East Pilbara
Broome	Derby-West Kimberley	Halls Creek
Ashburton	Shire of East Pilbara	Central Desert (NT)
Meekatharra	Wiluna	Ngaanyatjarraku

The Shire of East Pilbara is one of the four local government areas in the Pilbara region of Western Australia. With an area of 372,571 square kilometres (143,850 sq mi), larger than the Australian states of Victoria and Tasmania combined, it is the largest local government region in Australia. The Shire's seat of government, and home to nearly half the Shire's population, is the town of Newman in the shire's south-west.

== History ==
The Shire of East Pilbara was established on 27 May 1972 with the amalgamation of the Shire of Marble Bar and the Shire of Nullagine. The Shire offices and administration centre previously resided in the Town of Marble Bar, but in 1987 they were moved to Newman after BHP ceded the town (formerly a closed town) to the Shire.

== Wards ==
The Shire is divided into six wards, having a total of eleven Councillors and one Shire President:

- South Ward
- North
- North West
- Central
- Lower Central
- East

== Towns and localities ==
The towns and localities of the Shire of East Pilbara with population and size figures based on the most recent Australian census are as follows:

Locality	Population	Area	Map
Gibson Desert North	262 (SAL 2021)	114,520 km^{2} (44,220 sq mi)	
Marble Bar *	927 (SAL 2021)	35,032.9 km^{2} (13,526.3 sq mi)	
Newman	6,456 (SAL 2021)	28,031.2 km^{2} (10,822.9 sq mi)	
Nullagine	1,159 (SAL 2021)	21,884.4 km^{2} (8,449.6 sq mi)	
Pardoo	47 (SAL 2021)	2,276.4 km^{2} (878.9 sq mi)	
Telfer	657 (SAL 2021)	177,847.9 km^{2} (68,667.5 sq mi)	
Jigalong Community	306 (SAL 2021)	111.6 km^{2} (43.1 sq mi)	

- (* indicates locality is only partially located within this shire)

== Former towns ==
Former towns in the Shire of East Pilbara:

- Bamboo Creek
- Goldsworthy
- Shay Gap

== Heritage-listed places ==
As of 2023, 97 places are heritage-listed in the Shire of East Pilbara, of which seven are on the State Register of Heritage Places, among them Corunna Downs Station, Corunna Downs Airfield and the Ironclad Hotel.
