= List of State Register of Heritage Places in the Shire of East Pilbara =

The State Register of Heritage Places is maintained by the Heritage Council of Western Australia. As of 2026, 97 places are heritage-listed in the Shire of East Pilbara, of which seven are on the State Register of Heritage Places.

== List ==
The Western Australian State Register of Heritage Places, as of 2026, lists the following seven state registered places within the Shire of East Pilbara:

Place name	Place #	Location	Suburb or town	Co-ordinates	Built	State registered	Notes	Photo
Corunna Downs Station & Former Wartime Airbase	3695	Salgash Corunna Downs Road, approximately 40 km south of Marble Bar	Marble Bar	21°27′49″S 119°50′35″E	1897	30 March 2007	Also referred to as Brockman's Station (1890s); Typical example of a pastoral homestead group in the North West	
Corunna Downs Station	24460	Salgash Corunna Downs Road	Marble Bar	21°27′49″S 119°50′35″E			Part of Corunna Downs Station & Former Wartime Airbase Precinct (3695)	
Corunna Downs Wartime Air Base	14200	Salgash Corunna Downs Road	Marble Bar	21°26′00″S 119°46′58″E	1940		Part of Corunna Downs Station & Former Wartime Airbase Precinct (3695); Remains of a rare example in Western Australia of a strategic RAAF heavy bomber base, the only one in the RAAF’s Western Area used for a substantial number of heavy bomber operations during World War II	
Government Buildings	814	26 & 31 Station Street and Lot 500 Station Street	Marble Bar	21°10′21″S 119°44′35″E	1895	1 October 2002	Federation Arts and Crafts Style which was adapted and developed by George Temple Poole	
Ironclad Hotel	3954	Francis Street	Marble Bar	21°10′17″S 119°44′41″E	1892	17 November 2006	Hotel & Store Group - prior to fire at Store, Osborn's Hotel/Walter's Hotel/Osborn Parlour; Formerly included the Marble Bar Liquor & General Store, which was destroyed by fire in November 2004 and demolished; Example of North West Vernacular style architecture, with its corrugated iron wall cladding and roofs	
Halley's Comet Gold Mine	14198	Hillside Marble Bar Road	Marble Bar	21°14′05″S 119°43′35″E	1936	14 July 2006	Also referred to as Comet Mine, Comet Gold Mine; Former gold mine operation, consisting of an office, store, assay room, fitting shop, crushing shop, power house and gold room	
Poinciana House	817	50 Augusta Street	Marble Bar	21°10′15″S 119°44′51″E	1909	17 November 2006	Also referred to as CWA Centre, G J W G Miles House; Rare example of a stone residence in the North West	
