= Ironclad warship =

Steam-propelled warship protected by armor plates

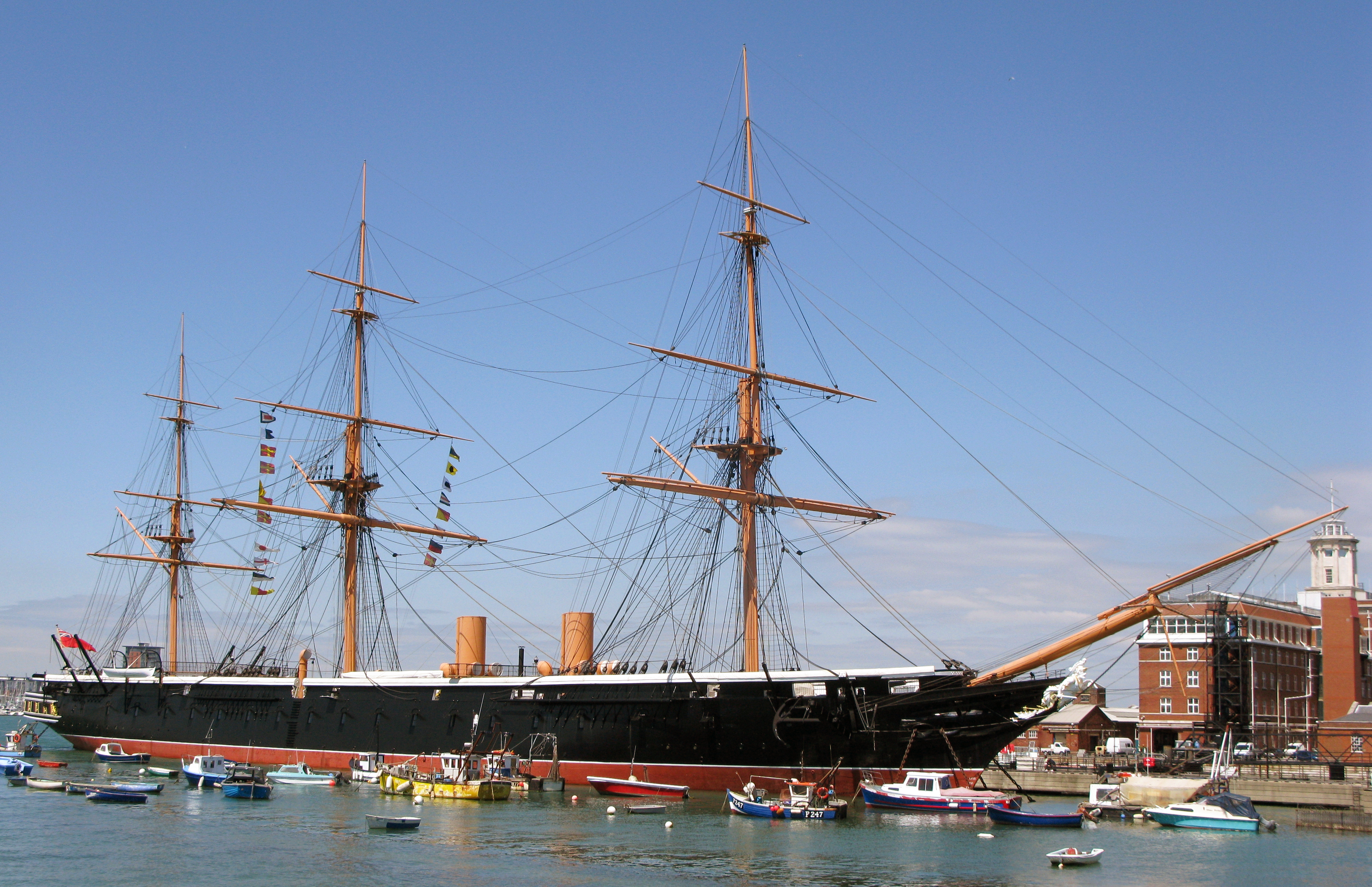
HMS Warrior (1860), one of the last surviving ironclad ships.

An ironclad was a steam-propelled warship protected by steel or iron armor constructed from 1859 to the early 1890s. The ironclad was developed as a result of the vulnerability of wooden warships to explosive and incendiary shells. The first ironclad battleship, Gloire, was launched by the French Navy in November 1859, narrowly preempting the British Royal Navy. However, Britain built the first completely iron-hulled warships.

Ironclads were first used in warfare in 1862 during the American Civil War, when they operated against wooden ships, and against each other at the Battle of Hampton Roads in Virginia. Their performance demonstrated that the ironclad had replaced the unarmored ship of the line as the most powerful warship afloat. Ironclad gunboats became very successful in the American Civil War.

Ironclads were designed for several uses, including as high-seas battleships, long-range cruisers, and coastal defense ships. Rapid development of warship design in the late 19th century transformed the ironclad from a wooden-hulled vessel that carried sails to supplement its steam engines into the steel-built, turreted battleships and cruisers familiar in the 20th century. This change was pushed forward by the development of heavier naval guns, more sophisticated steam engines, and advances in ferrous metallurgy that made steel shipbuilding possible.

The quick pace of change meant that many ships were obsolete almost as soon as they were finished and that naval tactics were in a state of flux. Many ironclads were built to make use of the naval ram, the torpedo, or sometimes both (as in the case with smaller ships and later torpedo boats), which several naval designers considered the important weapons of naval combat. There is no clear end to the ironclad period, but toward the end of the 1890s, the term ironclad dropped out of use. New ships were increasingly constructed to a standard pattern and designated as battleships or armored cruisers.

== Development ==
The ironclad became technically feasible and tactically necessary because of developments in shipbuilding in the first half of the 19th century. According to naval historian J. Richard Hill: "The (ironclad) had three chief characteristics: a metal-skinned hull, steam propulsion and a main armament of guns capable of firing explosive shells. It is only when all three characteristics are present that a fighting ship can properly be called an ironclad." Each of these developments was introduced separately in the decade before the first ironclads.

=== Steam propulsion ===
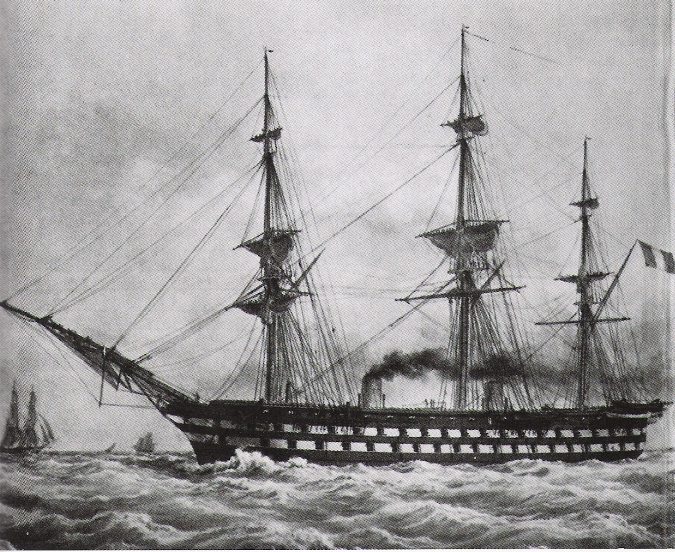
Napoléon (1850), the first steam battleship

In the 18th and early 19th centuries, fleets had relied on two types of major warship, the ship of the line and the frigate. The first major change to these types was the introduction of steam power for propulsion. While paddle steamer warships had been used from the 1830s onward, steam propulsion only became suitable for major warships after the adoption of the screw propeller in the 1840s.

Steam-powered screw frigates were built in the mid-1840s, and at the end of the decade the French Navy introduced steam power to its line of battle. Napoleon III's ambition to gain greater influence in Europe required a sustained challenge to the British at sea. The first purpose-built steam battleship was the 90-gun Napoléon in 1850. Napoléon was armed as a conventional ship-of-the-line, but her steam engines could give her a speed of 12 knots (22 km/h; 14 mph), regardless of the wind conditions: a potentially decisive advantage in a naval engagement.

The introduction of the steam ship-of-the-line led to a building competition between France and Britain. Eight sister ships to Napoléon were built in France over a period of ten years, but the United Kingdom soon managed to take the lead in production. Altogether, France built ten new wooden steam battleships and converted 28 from older ships of the line, while the United Kingdom built 18 and converted 41.

=== Explosive shells ===
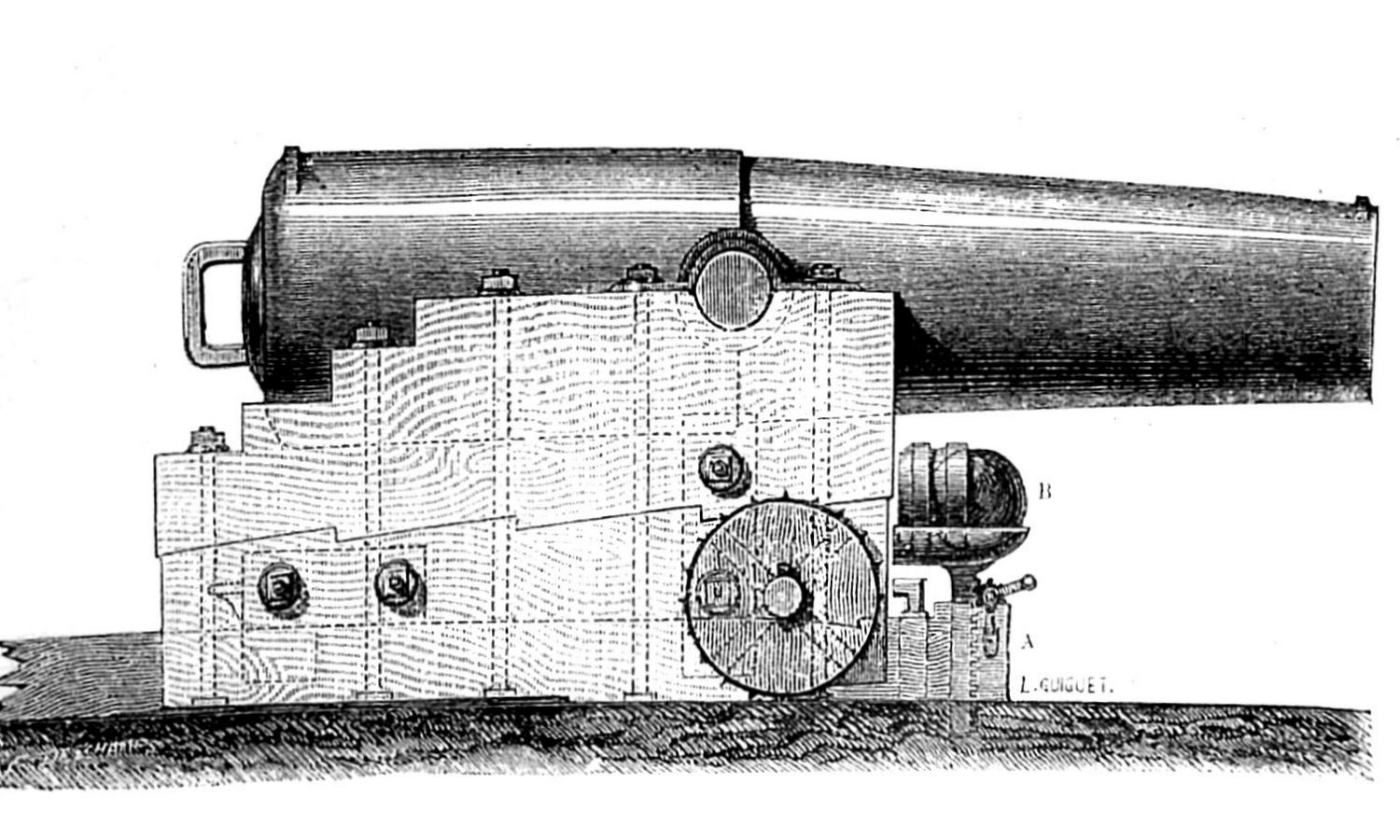
A Paixhans naval shell gun. 1860 engraving

The era of the wooden steam ship-of-the-line was brief, because of new, more powerful naval guns. In the 1820s and 1830s, warships began to mount increasingly heavy guns, replacing 18- and 24-pounder guns with 32-pounders on sailing ships-of-the-line and introducing 68-pounders on steamers. Then, the first shell guns firing explosive shells were introduced following their development by the French Général Henri-Joseph Paixhans. By the 1840s they were part of the standard armament for naval powers including the French Navy, Royal Navy, Imperial Russian Navy and United States Navy.

It is often held that the power of explosive shells to smash wooden hulls, as demonstrated by the Russian destruction of an Ottoman squadron at the Battle of Sinop, spelled the end of the wooden-hulled warship. The more practical threat to wooden ships was from conventional cannon firing red-hot shot, which could lodge in the hull and cause a fire or ammunition explosion. Some navies even experimented with hollow shot filled with molten metal for extra incendiary power.

=== Iron armor ===
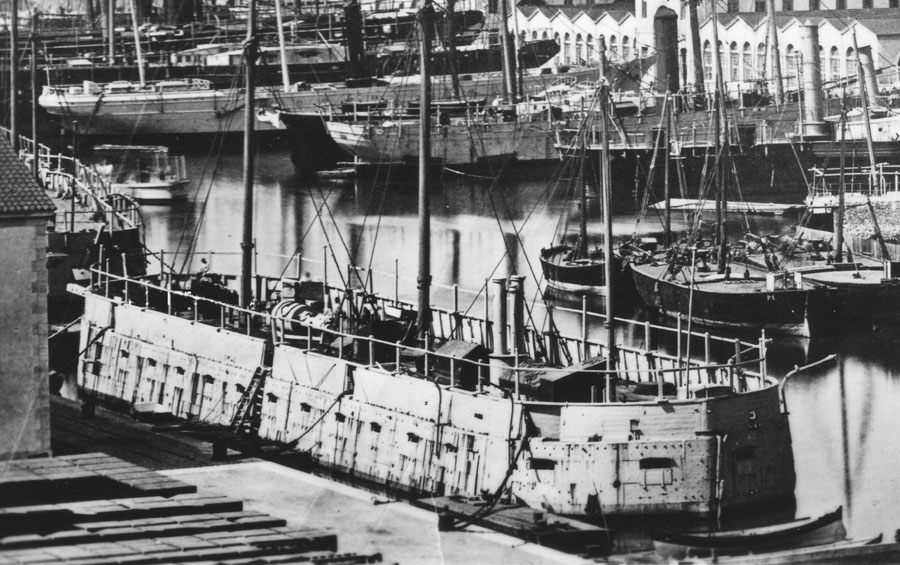
French Navy ironclad floating battery Lave, 1854. This ironclad, together with the similar Tonnante and Dévastation, vanquished Russian land batteries at the Battle of Kinburn (1855).

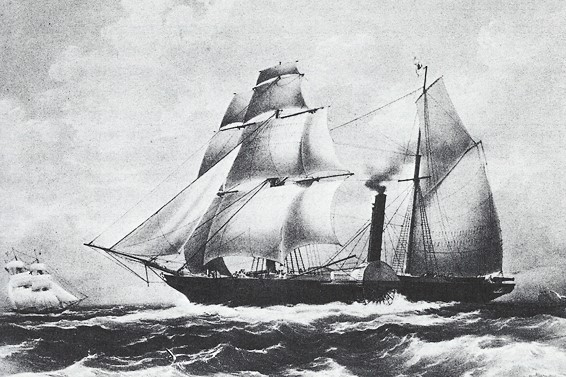
Mexican frigate Guadalupe 1842

The use of wrought iron instead of wood as the primary material of ships' hulls began in the 1830s; the first "warship" with an iron hull was the gunboat Nemesis, built by Jonathan Laird of Birkenhead for the East India Company in 1839. There followed, also from Laird, the first full-sized warship with a metal hull, the 1842 steam frigate Guadalupe for the Mexican Navy. The latter ship performed well during the Naval Battle of Campeche, with her captain reporting that he thought that there were fewer iron splinters from Guadalupe's hull than from a wooden hull.

Encouraged by the positive reports of the iron hulls of those ships in combat, the Admiralty ordered a series of experiments to evaluate what happened when thin iron hulls were struck by projectiles, both solid shot and hollow shells, beginning in 1845 and lasting through 1851. Critics like Lieutenant-general Sir Howard Douglas believed that the splinters from the hull were even more dangerous than those from wooden hulls and the tests partially confirmed this belief. What was ignored was that with 14 inches (356 mm) of wood backing, the iron would stop most of the splinters from penetrating and that relatively thin plates of iron backed by the same thickness of wood would generally cause shells to split open and fail to detonate.

The early experimental results seemed to support the critics and party politics came into play as the Whig First Russell ministry replaced the Tory Second Peel Ministry in 1846. The new administration sided with the critics and ordered that the four iron-hulled propeller frigates ordered by the Tories be converted into troopships. No iron warships would be ordered until the beginning of the Crimean War in 1854.

Following the demonstration of the power of explosive shells against wooden ships at the Battle of Sinop, and fearing that his own ships would be vulnerable to the Paixhans guns of Russian fortifications in the Crimean War, Emperor Napoleon III ordered the development of light-draft floating batteries, equipped with heavy guns and protected by heavy armor. Experiments made during the first half of 1854 proved highly satisfactory, and on 17 July 1854, the French communicated to the British Government that a solution had been found to make gun-proof vessels and that plans would be communicated. After tests in September 1854, the British Admiralty agreed to build five armored floating batteries on the French plans.

The French floating batteries were deployed in 1855 as a supplement to the wooden steam battle fleet in the Crimean War. The role of the battery was to assist unarmored mortar and gunboats bombarding shore fortifications. The French used three of their ironclad batteries (Lave, Tonnante and Dévastation) in 1855 against the defenses at the Battle of Kinburn on the Black Sea, where they were effective against Russian shore defences. They would later be used again during the Italian war in the Adriatic in 1859. The British floating batteries Glatton and Meteor arrived too late to participate to the action at Kinburn. The British planned to use theirs in the Baltic Sea against the well-fortified Russian naval base at Kronstadt.

The batteries have a claim to the title of the first ironclad warships but they were capable of only 4 knots (7.4 km/h; 4.6 mph) under their own power: they operated under their own power at the Battle of Kinburn, but had to be towed for long-range transit. They were also arguably marginal to the work of the navy. The brief success of the floating ironclad batteries convinced France to begin work on armored warships for their battlefleet.

== Early ironclad ships and battles ==
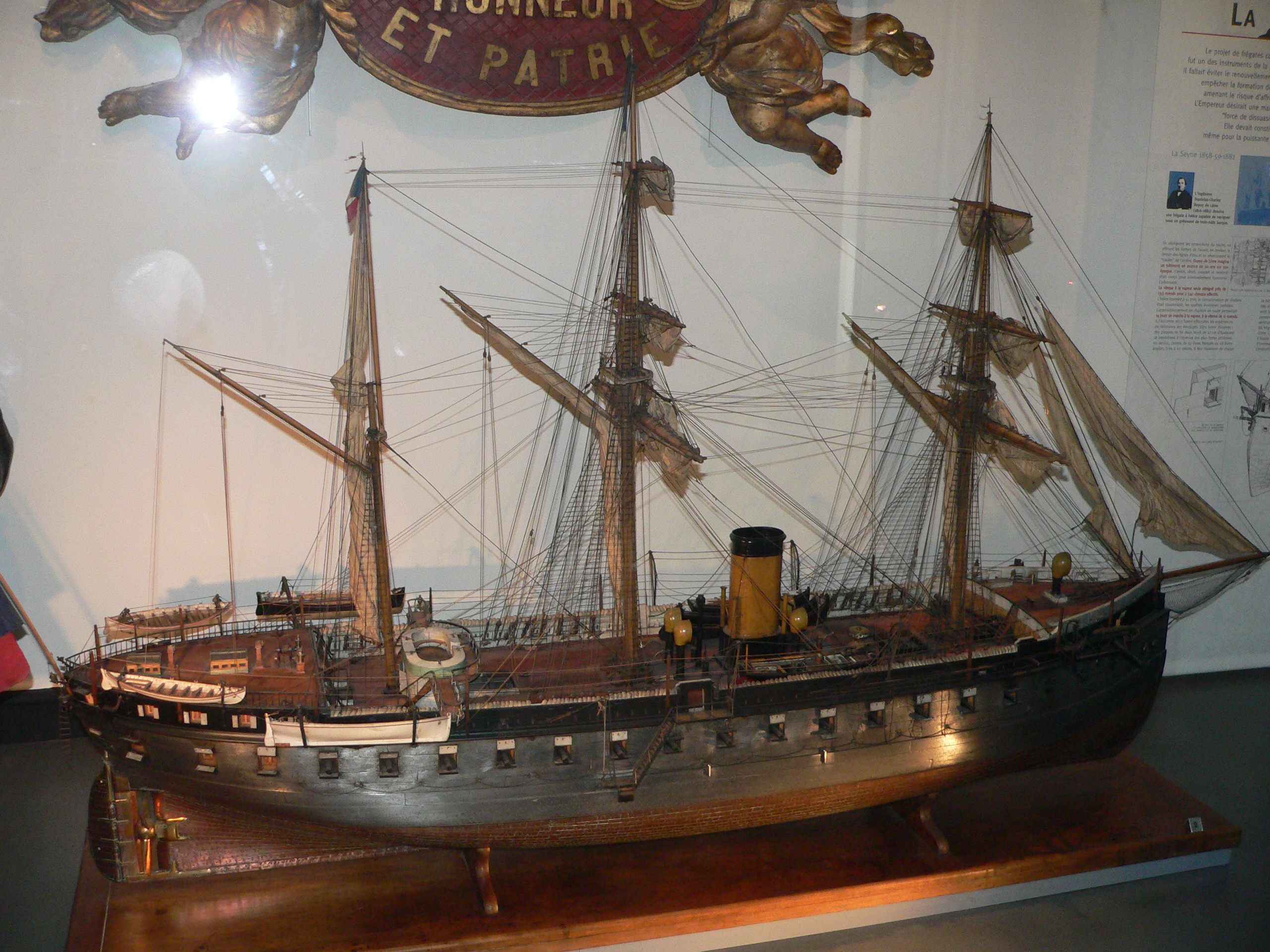
Model of the French Gloire (1858), the first ocean-going ironclad

By the end of the 1850s it was clear that France was unable to match British building of steam warships, and to regain the strategic initiative a dramatic change was required. The result was the first ocean-going ironclad, Gloire, begun in 1857 and launched in 1859. Gloire's wooden hull was modelled on that of a steam ship of the line, reduced to one deck, and sheathed in iron plates 4.5 inches (114 mm) thick. She was propelled by a steam engine, driving a single screw propeller for a speed of 13 knots (24 km/h; 15 mph). She was armed with thirty-six 6.4-inch (160 mm) rifled guns. France proceeded to construct 16 ironclad warships, including two sister ships to Gloire, and the only two-decked broadside ironclads ever built, Magenta and Solférino.

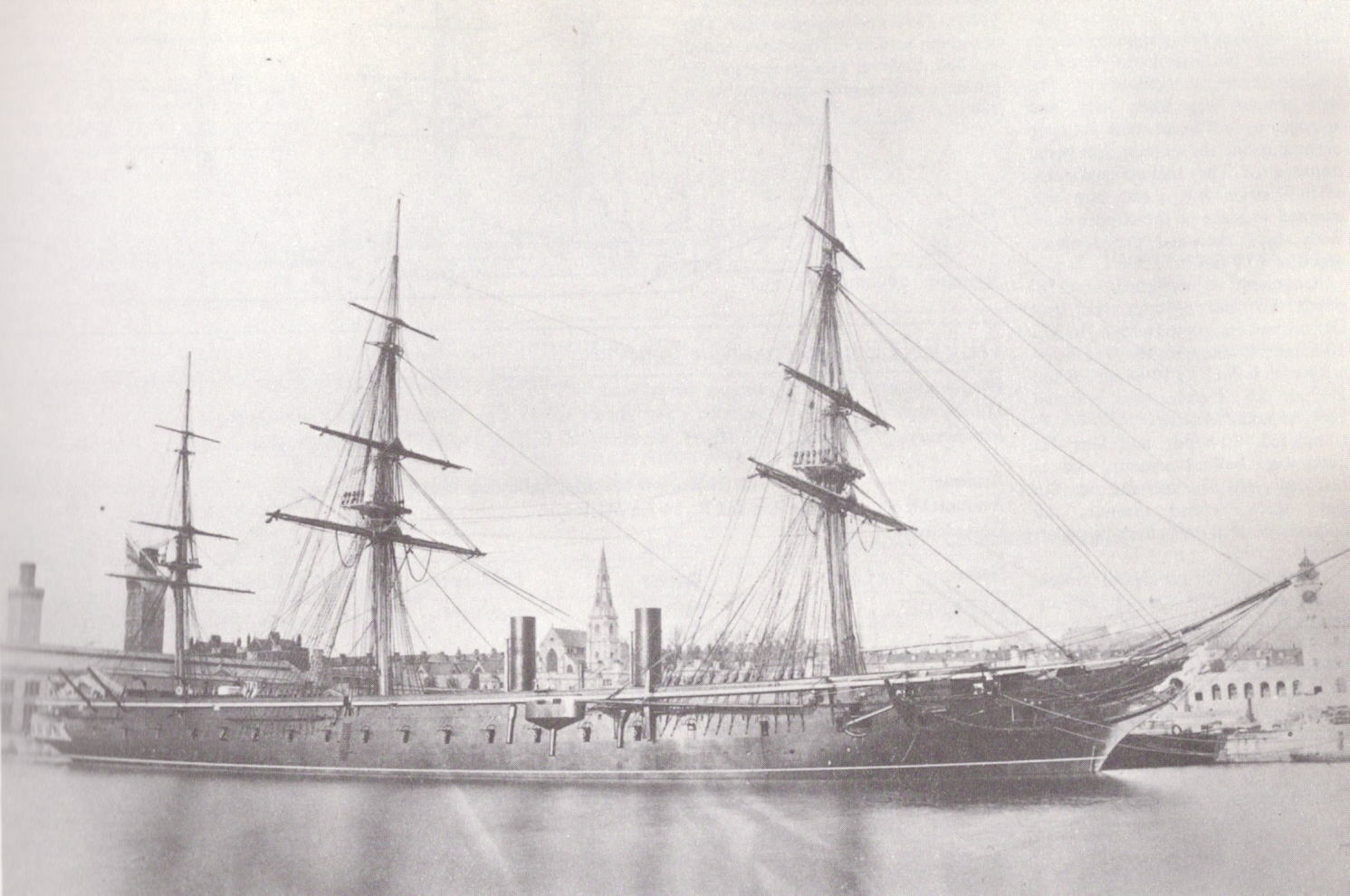
HMS Warrior (1860), Britain's first seagoing ironclad warship

The Royal Navy had not been keen to sacrifice its advantage in steam ships of the line, but was determined that the first British ironclad would outmatch the French ships in every respect, particularly speed. A fast ship would have the advantage of being able to choose a range of engagement that could make her invulnerable to enemy fire. The British specification was more a large, powerful frigate than a ship-of-the-line. The requirement for speed meant a very long vessel, which had to be built from iron. The result was the construction of two Warrior-class ironclads; HMS Warrior and HMS Black Prince. The ships had a successful design, though there were necessarily compromises between 'sea-keeping', strategic range and armor protection. Their weapons were more effective than those of Gloire, and with the largest set of steam engines yet fitted to a ship, they could steam at 14.3 knots (26.5 km/h). Yet the Gloire and her sisters had full iron-armor protection along the waterline and the battery itself.

The British Warrior and Black Prince (but also the smaller Defence and Resistance) were obliged to concentrate their armor in a central "citadel" or "armoured box", leaving many main deck guns and the fore and aft sections of the vessel unprotected. The use of iron in the construction of Warrior also came with some drawbacks; iron hulls required more regular and intensive repairs than wooden hulls, and iron was more susceptible to fouling by marine life.

By 1862, navies across Europe had adopted ironclads. Britain and France each had sixteen either completed or under construction, though the British vessels were larger. Austria, Italy, Russia, and Spain were also building ironclads. However, the first battles using the new ironclad ships took place during the American Civil War, between Union and Confederate ships in 1862. These were markedly different from the broadside-firing, masted designs of Gloire and Warrior. The clash of the Italian and Austrian fleets at the Battle of Lissa (1866), also had an important influence on the development of ironclad design.

=== First battles between ironclads: the U.S. Civil War ===
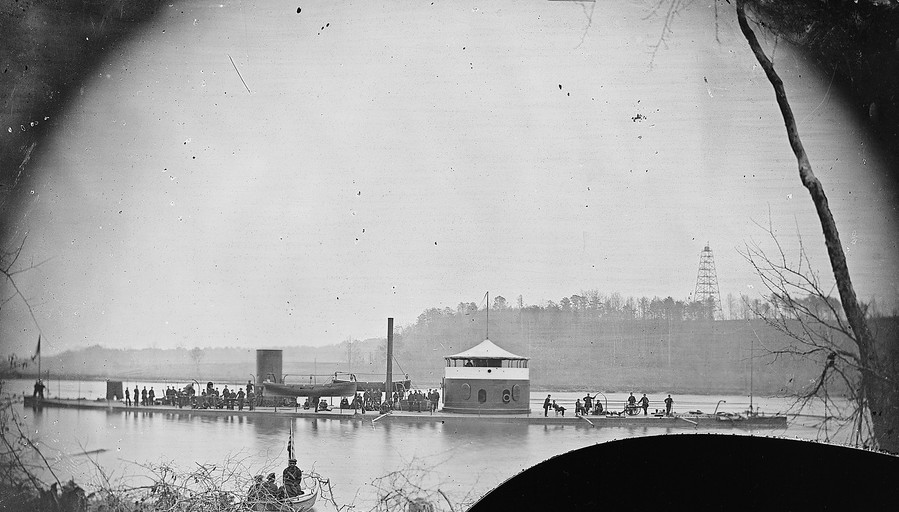
Canonicus-class monitor USS Mahopac on the Appomattox River, 1864

The first use of ironclads in combat came in the U.S. Civil War. The U.S. Navy at the time the war broke out had no ironclads, its most powerful ships being six unarmored steam-powered frigates. Since the bulk of the Navy remained loyal to the Union, the Confederacy sought to gain advantage in the naval conflict by acquiring modern armored ships. In May 1861, the Confederate Congress appropriated $2 million dollars for the purchase of ironclads from overseas, and in July and August 1861 the Confederacy started work on construction and converting wooden ships.

On 12 October 1861, CSS Manassas became the first ironclad to enter combat, when she fought Union warships on the Mississippi during the Battle of the Head of Passes. She had been converted from a commercial vessel in New Orleans for river and coastal fighting. In February 1862, the larger CSS Virginia joined the Confederate Navy, having been rebuilt at Norfolk. Constructed on the hull of USS Merrimack, Virginia originally was a conventional warship made of wood, but she was converted into an iron-covered casemate ironclad gunship, when she entered the Confederate Navy. By this time, the Union had completed seven ironclad gunboats of the City class, and was about to complete USS Monitor, an innovative design proposed by the Swedish inventor John Ericsson. The Union was also building a large armored frigate, USS New Ironsides, and the smaller USS Galena.

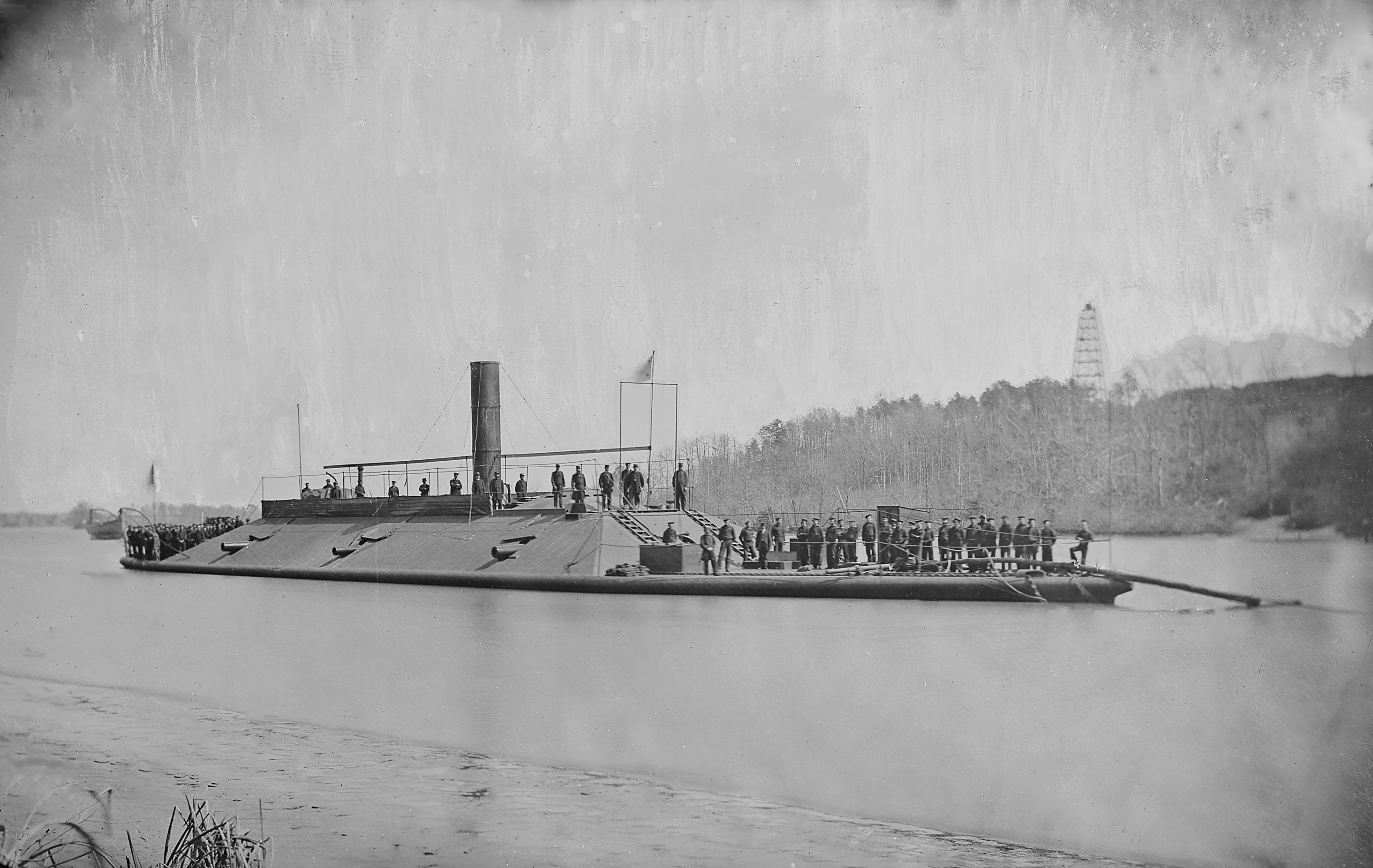
The Confederate ironclad Atlanta on the James River in 1864–1865 after her capture by Union forces

The first battle between ironclads happened on 9 March 1862, as the armored Monitor was deployed to protect the Union's wooden fleet from the ironclad ram Virginia and other Confederate warships. In this engagement, the second day of the Battle of Hampton Roads, the two ironclads tried to ram one another while shells bounced off their armor. The battle attracted attention worldwide, making it clear that the wooden warship was now out of date, with the ironclads destroying them easily.

The Civil War saw more ironclads built by both sides, and they played an increasing role in the naval war alongside the unarmored warships, commerce raiders and blockade runners. The Union built a large fleet of fifty monitors modeled on their namesake. The Confederacy built ships designed as smaller versions of Virginia, many of which saw action, but their attempts to buy ironclads overseas were frustrated as European nations confiscated ships being built for the Confederacy – especially in Russia, the only country to openly support the Union through the war. Only CSS Stonewall was completed, and she arrived in Cuban waters just in time for the end of the war.

Through the remainder of the war, ironclads saw action in the Union's attacks on Confederate ports. Seven Union monitors, including USS Montauk, as well as two other ironclads, the armored frigate New Ironsides and a light-draft USS Keokuk, participated in the failed attack on Charleston; one was sunk. Two small ironclads, CSS Palmetto State and CSS Chicora participated in the defense of the harbor. For the later attack at Mobile Bay, the Union assembled four monitors as well as 11 wooden ships, facing the CSS Tennessee, the Confederacy's most powerful ironclad, and three gunboats.

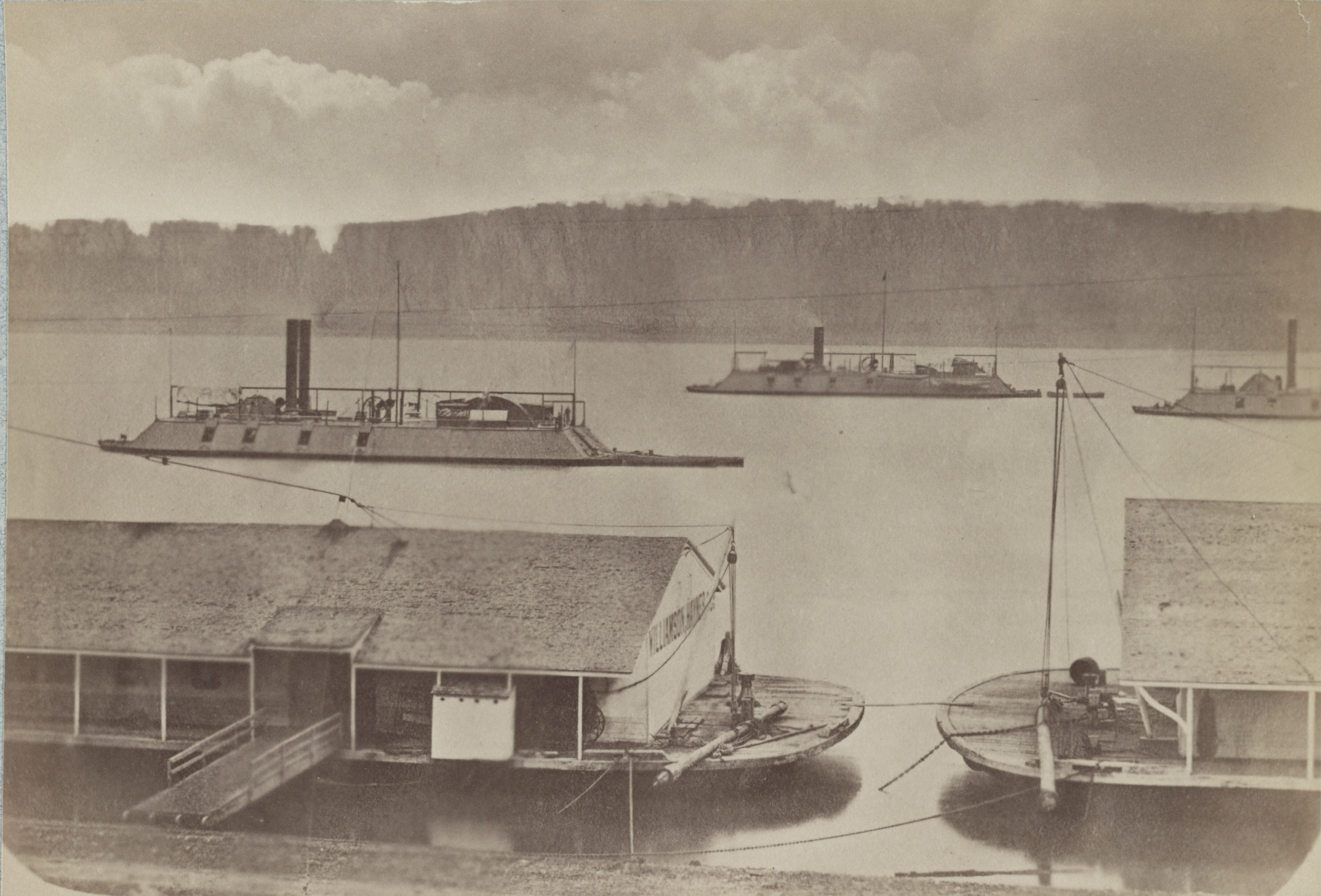
City-class ironclads off Cairo, Illinois, during the American Civil War

On the western front, the Union built a formidable force of river ironclads, beginning with several converted riverboats and then contracting engineer James Eads of St. Louis, Missouri to build the City-class ironclads. These excellent ships were built with twin engines and a central paddle wheel, all protected by an armored casemate. They had a shallow draft, allowing them to journey up smaller tributaries, and were very well suited for river operations. Eads also produced monitors for use on the rivers, the first two of which differed from the ocean-going monitors in that they contained a paddle wheel (USS Neosho and USS Osage).

The Union ironclads played an important role in the Mississippi and tributaries by providing tremendous fire upon Confederate forts, installations and vessels with relative impunity to enemy fire. They were not as heavily armored as the ocean-going monitors of the Union, but they were adequate for their intended use. More Western Flotilla Union ironclads were sunk by torpedoes (mines) than by enemy fire, and the most damaging fire for the Union ironclads was from shore installations, not Confederate vessels.

=== Lissa: first fleet battle ===
The fleets engaging for the Battle of Lissa

The first fleet battle, and the first ocean battle, involving ironclad warships was the Battle of Lissa in 1866. Waged between the Austrian and Italian navies, the battle pitted combined fleets of wooden frigates and corvettes and ironclad warships on both sides in the largest naval battle between the battles of Navarino and Tsushima.

The Italian fleet consisted of 12 ironclads and a similar number of wooden warships, escorting transports which carried troops intending to land on the Adriatic island of Lissa. Among the Italian ironclads were seven broadside ironclad frigates, four smaller ironclads, and the newly built Affondatore – a double-turreted ram. Opposing them, the Austrian navy had seven ironclad frigates.

The Austrians believed their ships to have less effective guns than their enemy, so decided to engage the Italians at close range and ram them. The Austrian fleet formed into an arrowhead formation with the ironclads in the first line, charging at the Italian ironclad squadron. In the melée which followed both sides were frustrated by the lack of damage inflicted by guns, and by the difficulty of ramming—nonetheless, the effective ramming attack being made by the Austrian flagship against the Italian attracted great attention in following years.

The superior Italian fleet lost its two ironclads, Re d'Italia and Palestro, while the Austrian unarmored screw two-decker SMS Kaiser remarkably survived close actions with four Italian ironclads. The battle ensured the popularity of the ram as a weapon in European ironclads for many years, and the victory won by Austria established it as the predominant naval power in the Adriatic.

The battles of the American Civil War and at Lissa were very influential on the designs and tactics of the ironclad fleets that followed. In particular, it taught a generation of naval officers the (ultimately erroneous) lesson that ramming was the best way to sink enemy ironclads.

== Armament and tactics ==
The adoption of iron armor meant that the traditional naval armament of dozens of light cannon became useless, since their shot would bounce off an armored hull. To penetrate armor, increasingly heavy guns were mounted on ships; nevertheless, the view that ramming was the only way to sink an ironclad became widespread. The increasing size and weight of guns also meant a movement away from the ships mounting many guns broadside, in the manner of a ship-of-the-line, towards a handful of guns in turrets for all-round fire.

=== Ram craze ===
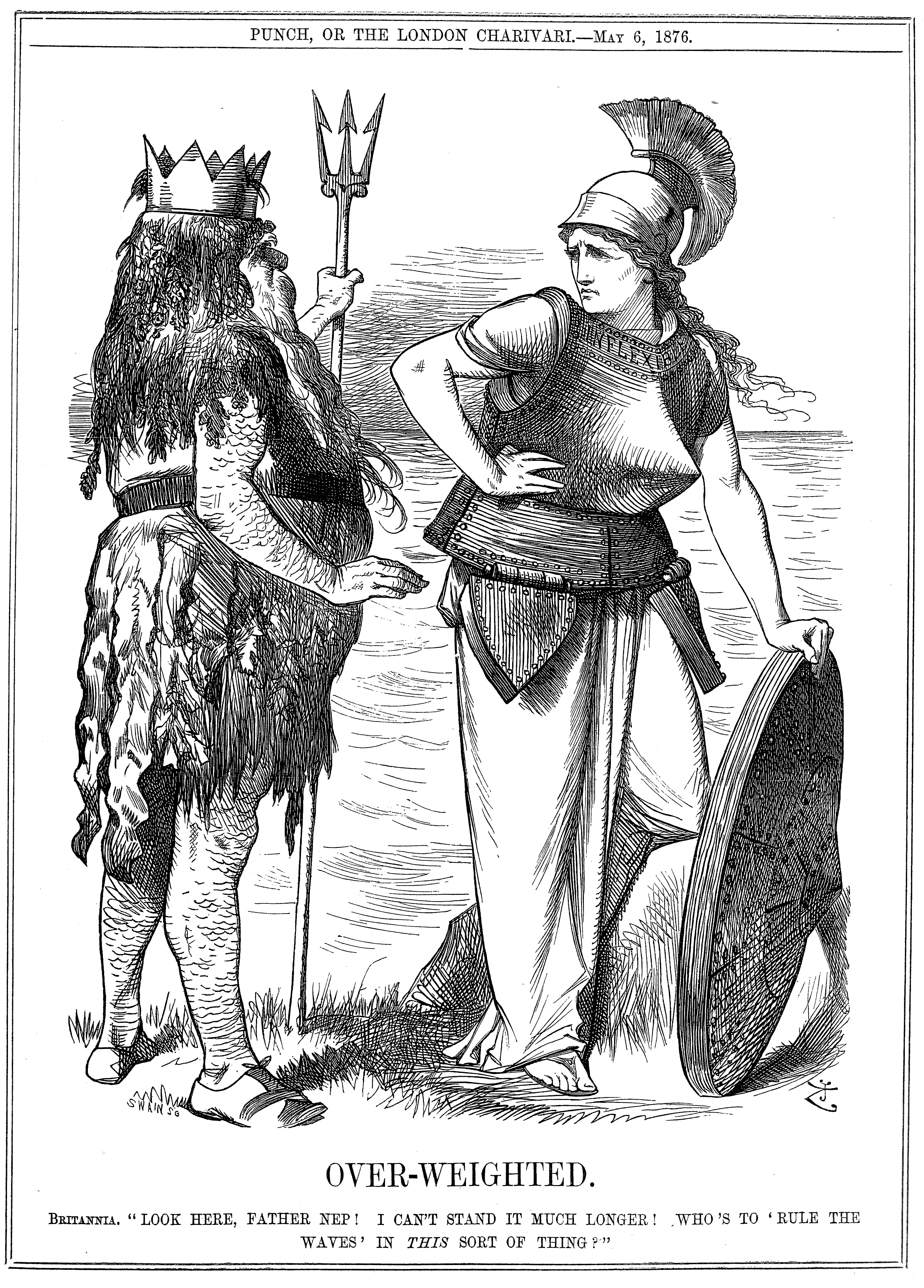
Punch cartoon from May 1876 showing Britannia dressed in the armor of an ironclad with the word Inflexible around her collar and addressing the sea god Neptune. Note the ram sticking out of Britannia's breast plate. The caption reads: OVER-WEIGHTED. Britannia. "Look here, Father Nep! I can't stand it much longer! Who's to 'rule the waves' in this sort of thing?"

From the 1860s to the 1880s many naval designers believed that the ram was again a vital weapon in naval warfare. With steam power freeing ships from the wind, iron construction increasing their structural strength, and armor making them invulnerable to shellfire, the ram seemed to offer the opportunity to strike a decisive blow.

The scant damage inflicted by the guns of Monitor and Virginia at Hampton Roads and the spectacular but lucky success of the Austrian flagship SMS Erzherzog Ferdinand Max sinking the Italian Re d'Italia at Lissa gave strength to the ramming craze. From the early 1870s to early 1880s most British naval officers thought that guns were about to be replaced as the main naval armament by the ram. Those who noted the tiny number of ships that had actually been sunk by ramming struggled to be heard.

The revival of ramming had a significant effect on naval tactics. Since the 17th century the predominant tactic of naval warfare had been the line of battle, where a fleet formed a long line to give it the best fire from its broadside guns. This tactic was totally unsuited to ramming, and the ram threw fleet tactics into disarray. The question of how an ironclad fleet should deploy in battle to make best use of the ram was never tested in battle, and if it had been, combat might have shown that rams could only be used against ships which were already stopped dead in the water.

The ram finally fell out of favor in the 1880s, as the same effect could be achieved with a torpedo, with less vulnerability to quick-firing guns.

=== Development of naval guns ===
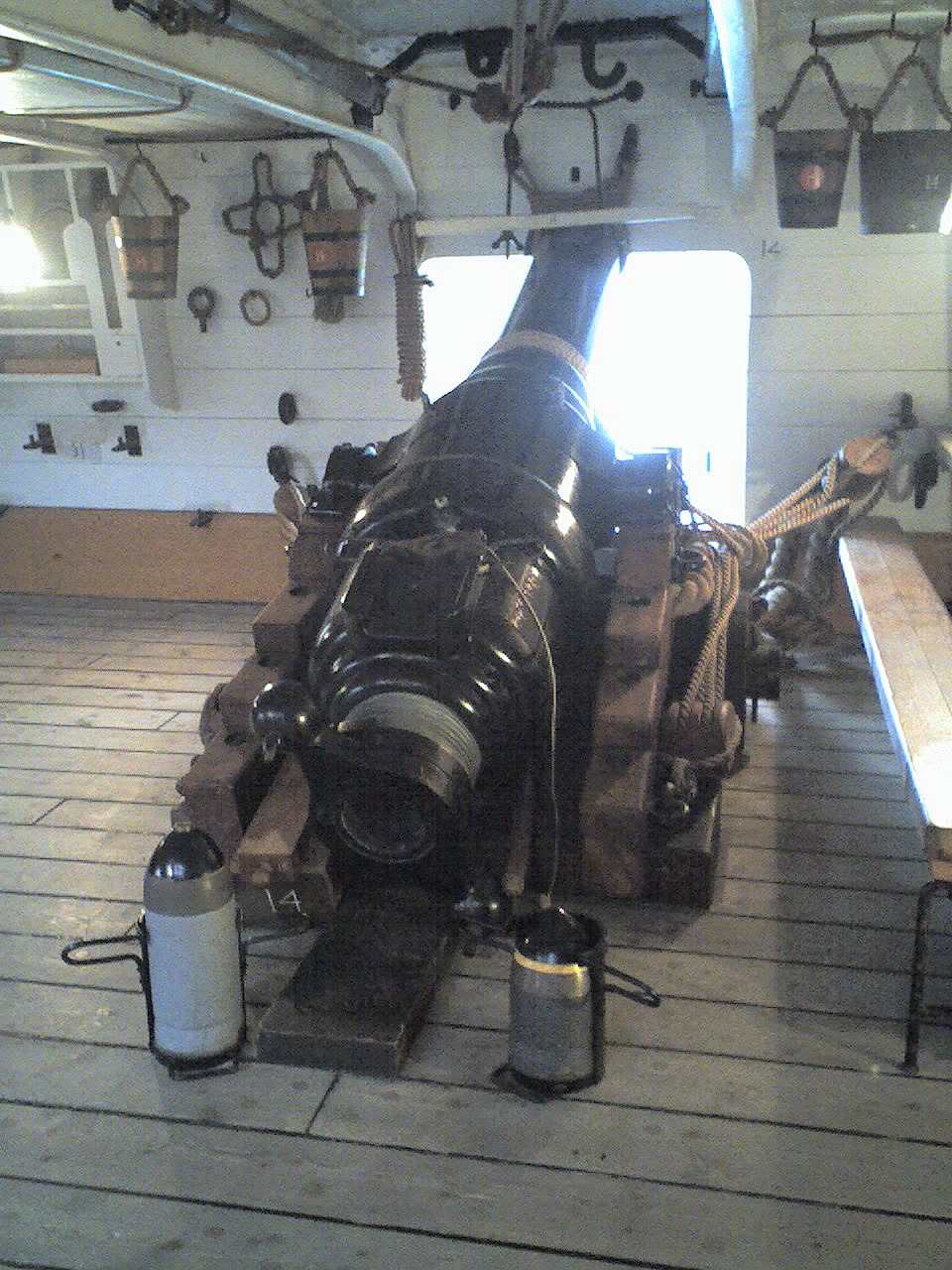
Breech-loading 110-pounder Armstrong gun on HMS Warrior

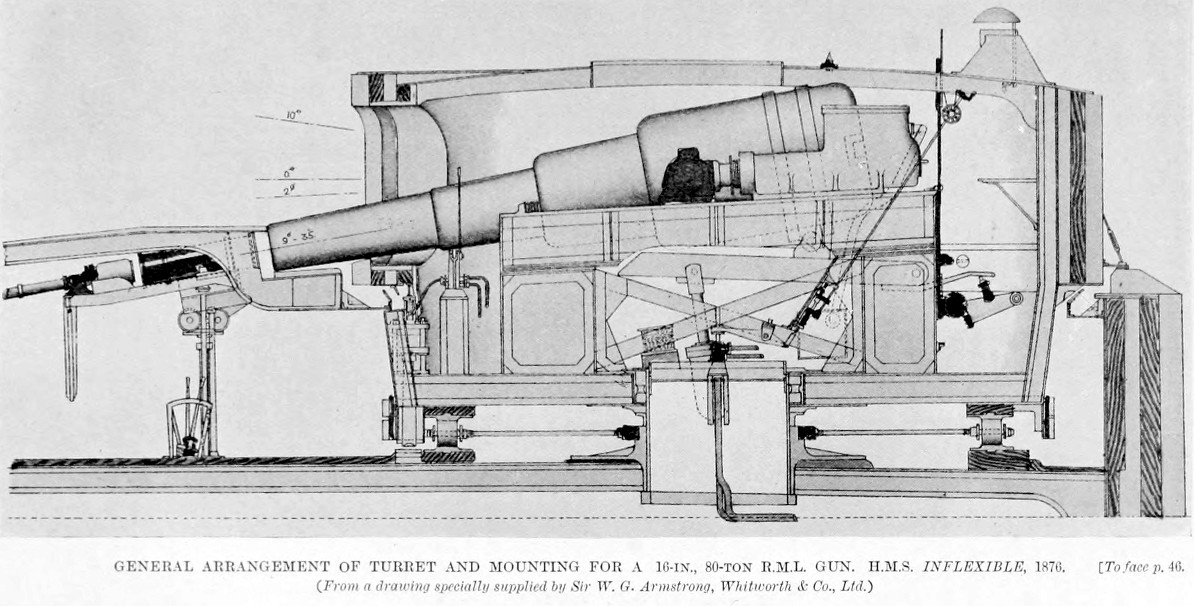
The reloading mechanism onboard HMS Inflexible

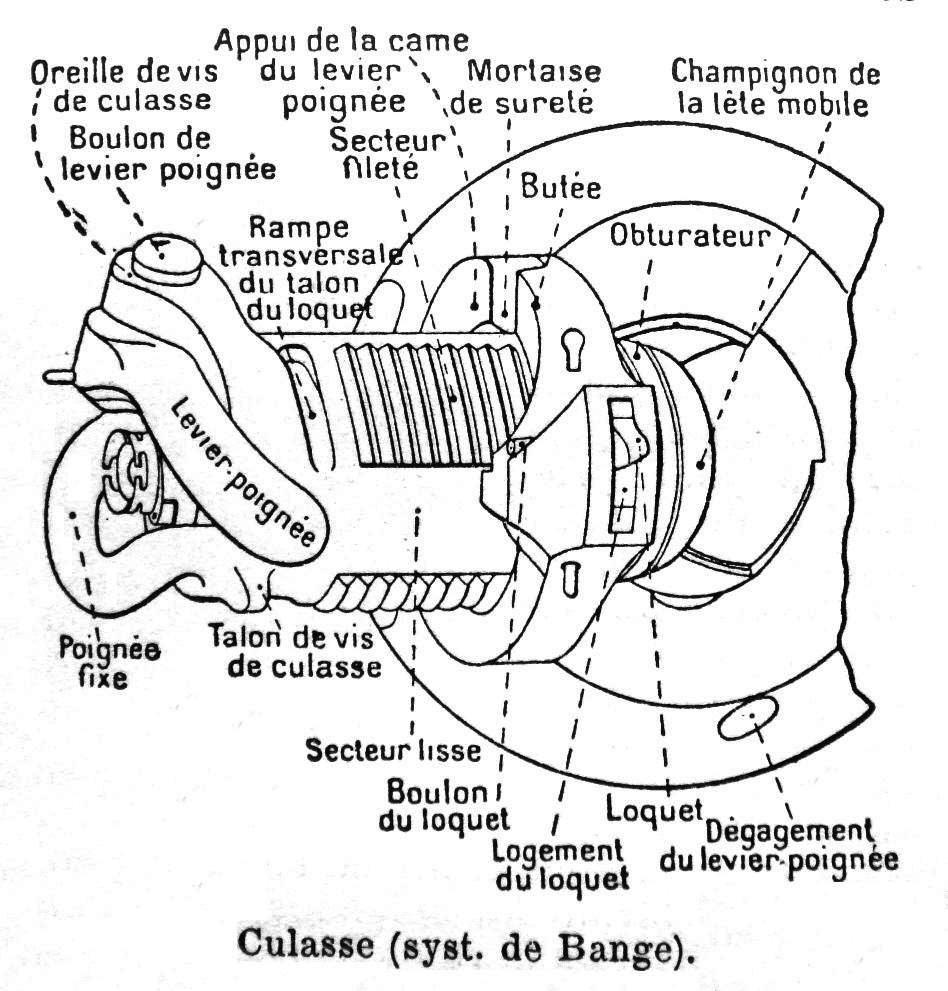
The obturator invented by de Bange allowed the effective sealing of breeches in breech-loading guns

The armament of ironclads tended to become concentrated in a small number of powerful guns capable of penetrating the armor of enemy ships at range; calibre and weight of guns increased markedly to achieve greater penetration. Throughout the ironclad era navies also grappled with the complexities of rifled versus smoothbore guns and breech-loading versus muzzle-loading.

HMS Warrior carried a mixture of 110-pounder 7-inch (178 mm) breech-loading rifles and more traditional 68-pounder smoothbore guns. Warrior highlighted the challenges of picking the right armament; the breech-loaders she carried, designed by Sir William Armstrong, were intended to be the next generation of heavy armament for the Royal Navy, but were shortly withdrawn from service.

Breech-loading guns seemed to offer important advantages. A breech-loader could be reloaded without moving the gun, a lengthy process particularly if the gun then needed to be re-aimed. Warrior's Armstrong guns also had the virtue of being lighter than an equivalent smoothbore and, because of their rifling, more accurate. Nonetheless, the design was rejected because of problems which plagued breech-loaders for decades.

The weakness of the breech-loader was the obvious problem of sealing the breech. All guns are powered by the explosive conversion of a solid propellant into gas. This explosion propels the shot or shell out of the front of the gun, but also imposes great stresses on the gun-barrel. If the breech—which experiences some of the greatest forces in the gun—is not entirely secure, then there is a risk that either gas will discharge through the breech or that the breech will break. This in turn reduces the muzzle velocity of the weapon and can also endanger the gun crew. Warrior's Armstrong guns suffered from both problems; the shells were unable to penetrate the 4.5-inch (114 mm) armor of Gloire, while sometimes the screw which closed the breech flew backwards out of the gun on firing. Similar problems were experienced with the breech-loading guns which became standard in the French and German navies.

These problems influenced the British to equip ships with muzzle-loading weapons of increasing power until the 1880s. After a brief introduction of the 100-pounder or 9.2-inch (230 mm) smoothbore Somerset Gun, which weighed 6.5 long tons (6.6 t), the Admiralty introduced 7-inch (178 mm) rifled guns, weighing 7 long tons (7 t). These were followed by a series of increasingly mammoth weapons—guns weighing 12 long tons (12 t), 18 long tons (18 t), 25 long tons (25 t), 38 long tons (39 t) and finally 81 long tons (82 t), with caliber increasing from 8 inches (203 mm) to 16 inches (406 mm).

The decision to retain muzzle-loaders until the 1880s has been criticized by historians. However, at least until the late 1870s, the British muzzle-loaders had superior performance in terms of both range and rate of fire than the French and Prussian breech-loaders, which suffered from the same problems as the first Armstrong guns.

From 1875 onwards, the balance between breech- and muzzle-loading changed. Captain de Bange invented a method of reliably sealing a breech, adopted by the French in 1873. Just as compellingly, the growing size of naval guns and consequently, their ammunition, made muzzle-loading much more complicated. With guns of such size there was no prospect of hauling in the gun for reloading, or even reloading by hand, and complicated hydraulic systems were required for reloading the gun outside the turret without exposing the crew to enemy fire. In 1882, the 81-ton, 16-inch guns of HMS Inflexible fired only once every 11 minutes while bombarding Alexandria during the Urabi Revolt. The 102-long-ton (104 t), 450 mm (17.72 inch) guns of the Duilio class could each fire a round every 15 minutes.

In the Royal Navy, the switch to breech-loaders was finally made in 1879; as well as the significant advantages in terms of performance, opinion was swayed by an explosion on board HMS Thunderer caused by a gun being double-loaded, a problem which could only happen with a muzzle-loading gun.

The caliber and weight of guns could only increase so far. The larger the gun, the slower it would be to load, the greater the stresses on the ship's hull, and the less the stability of the ship. The size of the gun peaked in the 1880s, with some of the heaviest calibers of gun ever used at sea. HMS Benbow carried two 16.25-inch (413 mm) breech-loading guns, each weighing 110 long tons (112 t). A few years afterwards, the Italians used 450 mm (17.72 inch) muzzle-loading guns on the Duilio class ships. (Note: The Royal Navy did build 18-inch (457 mm) guns for the light battlecruiser HMS Furious though she was completed as an aircraft carrier and her guns were fitted to the Lord Clive-class monitors, seeing service in World War I.) One consideration which became more acute was that even from the original Armstrong models, following the Crimean War, range and hitting power far exceeded simple accuracy, especially at sea where the slightest roll or pitch of the vessel as 'floating weapons-platform' could negate the advantage of rifling. American ordnance experts accordingly preferred smoothbore monsters whose round shot could at least 'skip' along the surface of the water. Actual effective combat ranges, they had learned during the Civil War, were comparable to those in the Age of Sail—though a vessel could now be smashed to pieces in only a few rounds. Smoke and the general chaos of battle only added to the problem. As a result, many naval engagements in the 'Age of the Ironclad' were still fought at ranges within easy eyesight of their targets, and well below the maximum reach of their ships' guns.

Another method of increasing firepower was to vary the projectile fired or the nature of the propellant. Early ironclads used black powder, which expanded rapidly after combustion; this meant cannons had relatively short barrels, to prevent the barrel itself slowing the shell. The sharpness of the black powder explosion also meant that guns were subjected to extreme stress. One important step was to press the powder into pellets, allowing a slower, more controlled explosion and a longer barrel. A further step forward was the introduction of chemically different brown powder which combusted more slowly again. It also put less stress on the insides of the barrel, allowing guns to last longer and to be manufactured to tighter tolerances.

The development of smokeless powder, based on nitroglycerine or nitrocellulose, by the French inventor Paul Vielle in 1884 was a further step allowing smaller charges of propellant with longer barrels. The guns of the pre-Dreadnought battleships of the 1890s tended to be smaller in caliber compared to the ships of the 1880s, most often 12 in (305 mm), but progressively grew in length of barrel, making use of improved propellants to gain greater muzzle velocity.

The nature of the projectiles also changed during the ironclad period. Initially, the best armor-piercing projectile was a solid cast-iron shot. Later, shot of chilled iron, a harder iron alloy, gave better armor-piercing qualities. Eventually the armor-piercing shell was developed.

=== Positioning of armament ===
==== Broadside ironclads ====
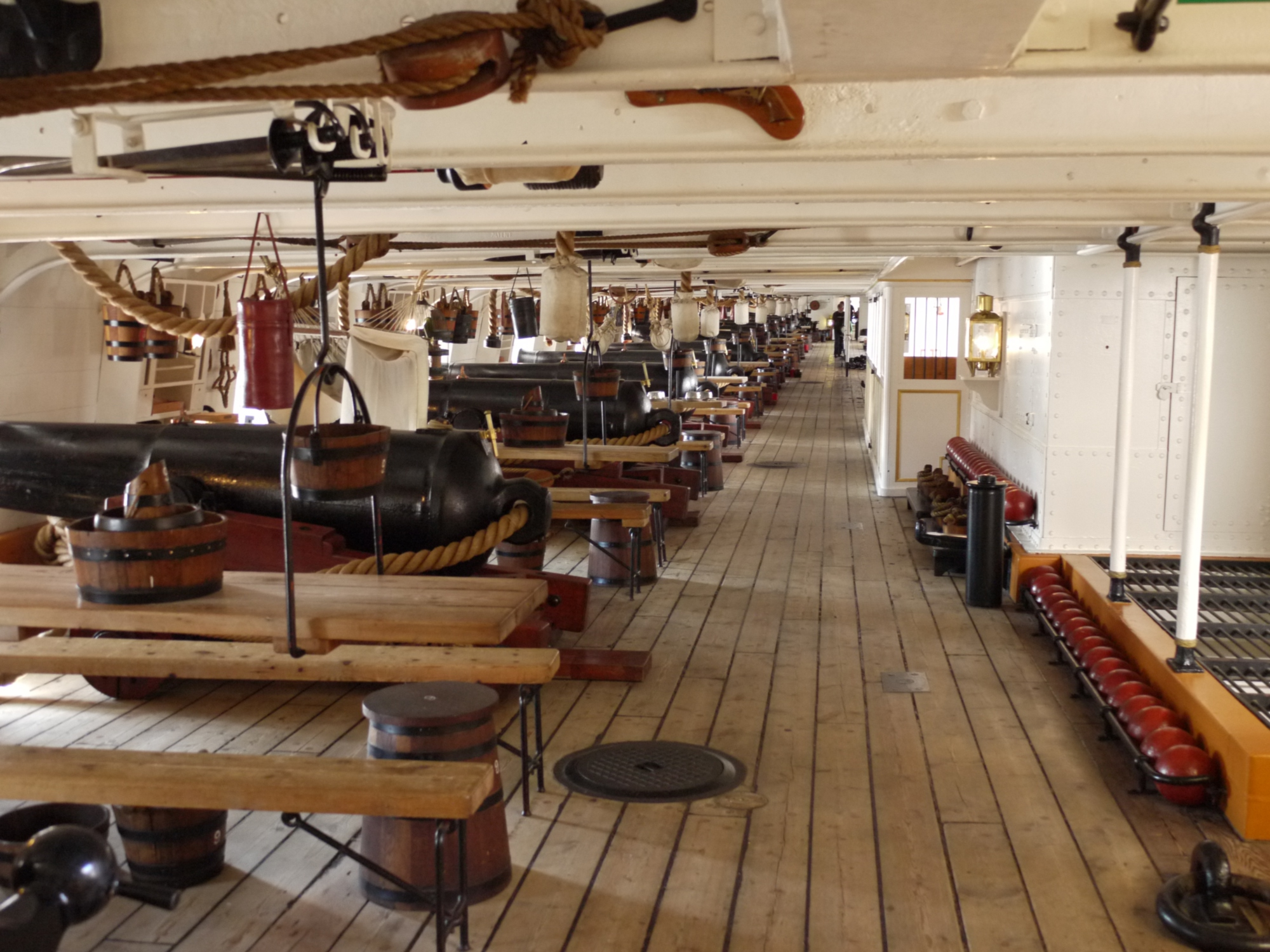
The conventional broadside of 68-pounders on HMS Warrior of 1860

The first British, French and Russian ironclads, in a logical development of warship design from the long preceding era of wooden ships of the line, carried their weapons in a single line along their sides and so were called "broadside ironclads". Both Gloire and HMS Warrior were examples of this type. Because their armor was so heavy, they could only carry a single row of guns along the main deck on each side rather than a row on each deck.

A significant number of broadside ironclads were built in the 1860s, principally in Britain and France, but in smaller numbers by other powers including Italy, Austria, Russia and the United States. The advantages of mounting guns on both broadsides was that the ship could engage more than one adversary at a time, and the rigging did not impede the field of fire.

Broadside armament also had disadvantages, which became more serious as ironclad technology developed. Heavier guns to penetrate ever-thicker armor meant that fewer guns could be carried. Furthermore, the adoption of ramming as an important tactic meant the need for ahead and all-round fire. These problems led to broadside designs being superseded by designs that gave greater all-round fire, which included central-battery, turret, and barbette designs.

==== Turrets, batteries, and barbettes ====
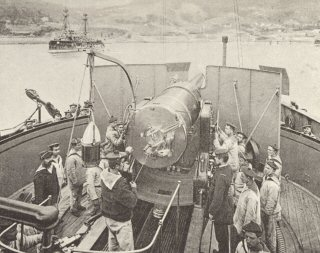
A barbette of Redoutable

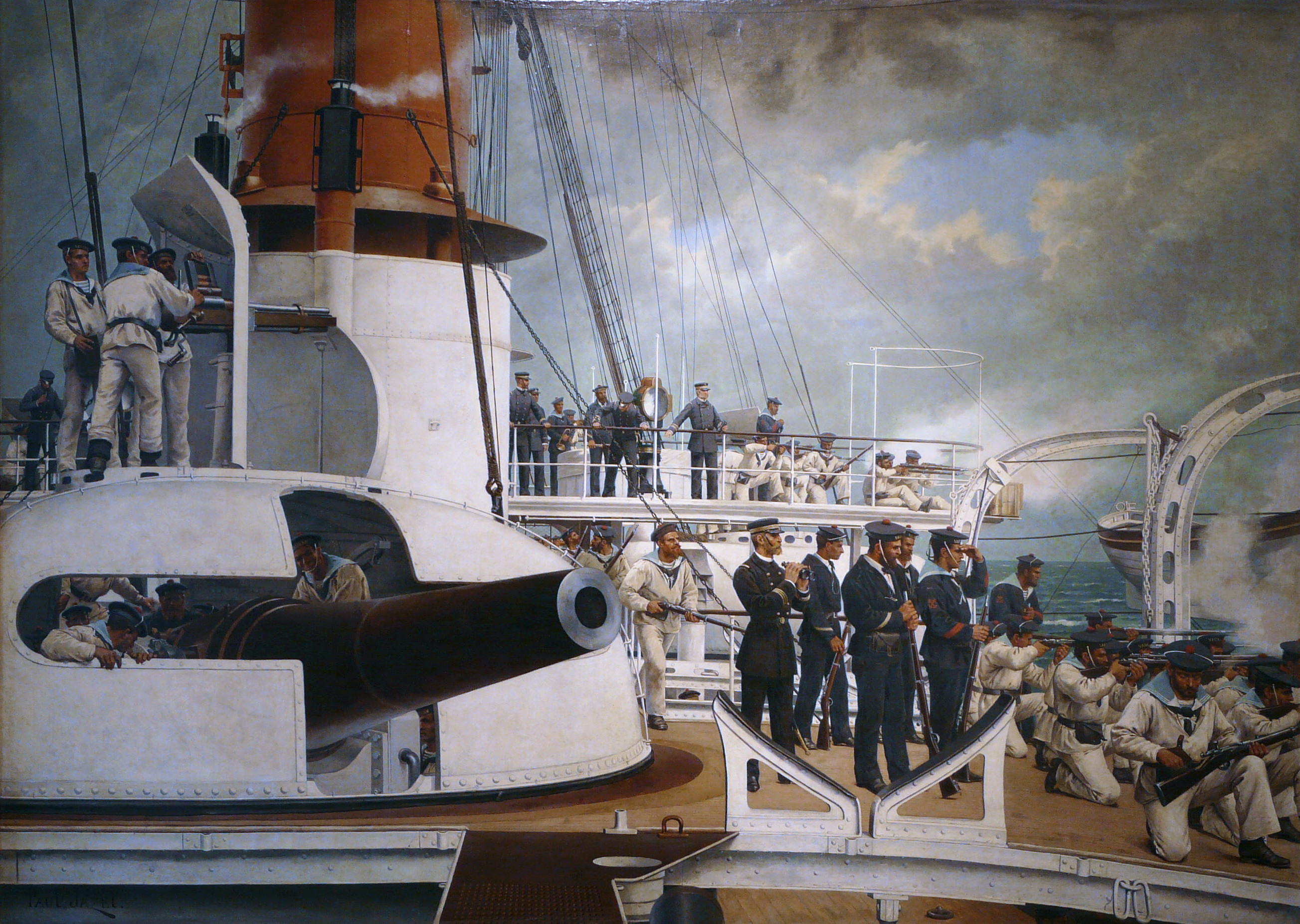
Barbette of the Vauban

There were two main design alternatives to the broadside. In one design, the guns were placed in an armored casemate amidships: this arrangement was called the 'box-battery' or 'center-battery'. In the other, the guns could be placed on a rotating platform to give them a broad field of fire; when fully armored, this arrangement was called a turret and when partially armored or unarmored, a barbette.

The centre-battery was the simpler and, during the 1860s and 1870s, the more popular method. Concentrating guns amidships meant the ship could be shorter and handier than a broadside type. The first full-scale center-battery ship was HMS Bellerophon of 1865; the French laid down centre-battery ironclads in 1865 which were not completed until 1870. Centre-battery ships often, but not always, had a recessed freeboard enabling some of their guns to fire directly ahead.

The turret was first used in naval combat on USS Monitor in 1862, with a type of turret designed by the Swedish engineer John Ericsson. A competing turret design was proposed by the British inventor Cowper Coles with a prototype of this installed on HMS Trusty in 1861 for testing and evaluation purposes. Ericsson's turret turned on a central spindle, and Coles's turned on a ring of bearings. Turrets offered the maximum arc of fire for the guns, but there were significant problems with their use in the 1860s. The fire arc of a turret would be considerably limited by masts and rigging, so they were unsuited to use on the earlier ocean-going ironclads. The second problem was that turrets were extremely heavy. Ericsson was able to offer the heaviest possible turret (guns and armor protection) by deliberately designing a ship with very low freeboard. The weight thus saved from having a high broadside above the waterline was diverted to actual guns and armor. Low freeboard, however, also meant a smaller hull and therefore a smaller capacity for coal storage—and therefore range of the vessel. In many respects, the turreted, low-freeboard Monitor and the broadside sailor HMS Warrior represented two opposite extremes in what an 'Ironclad' was all about. The most dramatic attempt to compromise these two extremes, or 'squaring this circle', was designed by Captain Cowper Phipps Coles: HMS Captain. It was a dangerously low freeboard turret ship, which nevertheless carried a full rig of sail and subsequently capsized not long after her launch in 1870. Her half-sister HMS Monarch was restricted to firing from her turrets only on the port and starboard beams. The third Royal Navy ship to combine turrets and masts was HMS Inflexible of 1876, which carried two turrets on either side of the center-line, allowing both to fire fore, aft and broadside.

A lighter alternative to the turret, particularly popular with the French navy, was the barbette. These were fixed armored towers which held a gun on a turntable. The crew was sheltered from direct fire, but vulnerable to plunging fire, for instance from shore emplacements. The barbette was lighter than the turret, needing less machinery and no roof armor. Some barbettes were stripped of their armor plate to reduce the top-weight of their ships. The barbette became widely adopted in the 1880s, and with the addition of an armored 'gun-house', transformed into the turrets of the pre-dreadnought battleships.

=== Torpedoes ===
The ironclad age saw the development of explosive torpedoes as naval weapons, which helped complicate the design and tactics of ironclad fleets. The first torpedoes were static mines, used extensively in the American Civil War. That conflict also saw the development of the spar torpedo, an explosive charge pushed against the hull of a warship by a small boat. For the first time, a large warship faced a serious threat from a smaller one—and given the relative inefficiency of shellfire against ironclads, the threat from the spar torpedo was taken seriously. The U.S. Navy converted four of its monitors to become turretless armored spar-torpedo vessels while under construction in 1864–1865, but these vessels never saw action. Another proposal, the towed or 'Harvey' torpedo, involved an explosive on a line or outrigger; either to deter a ship from ramming or to make a torpedo attack by a boat less suicidal.

A more practical and influential weapon was the self-propelled or Whitehead torpedo. Invented in 1868 and deployed in the 1870s, it formed part of the armament of ironclads of the 1880s like HMS Inflexible and the Italian Duilio class. The ironclad's vulnerability to the torpedo was a key part of the critique of armored warships made by the Jeune Ecole school of naval thought; it appeared that any ship armored enough to prevent destruction by gunfire would be slow enough to be easily caught by torpedo. In practice, however, the Jeune Ecole was only briefly influential and the torpedo formed part of the confusing mixture of weapons possessed by ironclads.

== Armor and construction ==
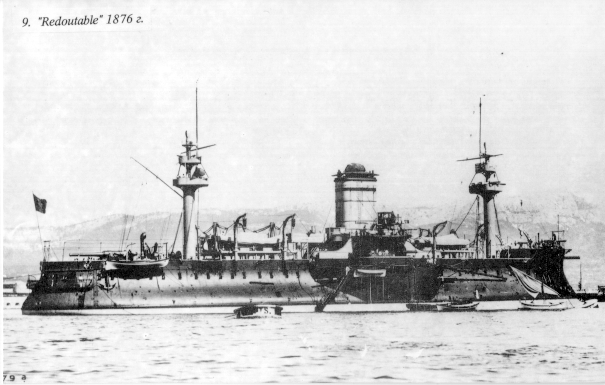
The French Redoutable (1876), the first battleship to use steel as the main building material

The first ironclads were built on wooden or iron hulls, and protected by wrought iron armor backed by thick wooden planking. Ironclads were still being built with wooden hulls into the 1870s.

=== Hulls: iron, wood, and steel ===
Using wrought iron construction for warships offered advantages for the engineering of the hull. However, unarmored iron had many military disadvantages, and offered technical problems which kept wooden hulls in use for many years, particularly for long-range cruising warships.

Iron ships had first been proposed for military use in the 1820s. In the 1830s and 1840s, France, Britain and the United States had all experimented with iron-hulled but unarmored gunboats and frigates. However, the iron-hulled frigate was abandoned by the end of the 1840s, because iron hulls were more vulnerable to solid shot; iron was more brittle than wood, and iron frames more likely to fall out of shape than wood.

The unsuitability of unarmored iron for warship hulls meant that iron was only adopted as a building material for battleships when protected by armor. However, iron gave the naval architect many advantages. Iron allowed larger ships and more flexible design, for instance the use of watertight bulkheads on the lower decks. Warrior, built of iron, was longer and faster than the wooden-hulled Gloire. Iron could be produced to order and used immediately, in contrast to the need to give wood a long period of seasoning. And, given the large quantities of wood required to build a steam warship and the falling cost of iron, iron hulls were increasingly cost-effective. The main reason for the French use of wooden hulls for the ironclad fleet built in the 1860s was that the French iron industry could not supply enough, and the main reason why Britain built its handful of wooden-hulled ironclads was to make best use of hulls already started and wood already bought.

Wooden hulls continued to be used for long-range and smaller ironclads, because iron nevertheless had a significant disadvantage. Iron hulls suffered quick fouling by marine life, slowing the ships down—manageable for a European battlefleet close to dry docks, but a difficulty for long-range ships. The only solution was to sheath the iron hull first in wood and then in copper, a laborious and expensive process which made wooden construction remain attractive. Iron and wood were to some extent interchangeable: the Japanese Kongō and Hiei ordered in 1875 were sister-ships, but one was built of iron and the other of composite construction.

After 1872, steel started to be introduced as a material for construction. Compared to iron, steel allows for greater structural strength for a lower weight. The French Navy led the way with the use of steel in its fleet, starting with the Redoutable, laid down in 1873 and launched in 1876. Redoutable nonetheless had wrought iron armor plate, and part of her exterior hull was iron rather than steel.

Even though Britain led the world in steel production, the Royal Navy was slow to adopt steel warships. The Bessemer process for steel manufacture produced too many imperfections for large-scale use on ships. French manufacturers used the Siemens-Martin process to produce adequate steel, but British technology lagged behind. The first all-steel warships built by the Royal Navy were the dispatch vessels Iris and Mercury, laid down in 1875 and 1876.

=== Armor and protection schemes ===
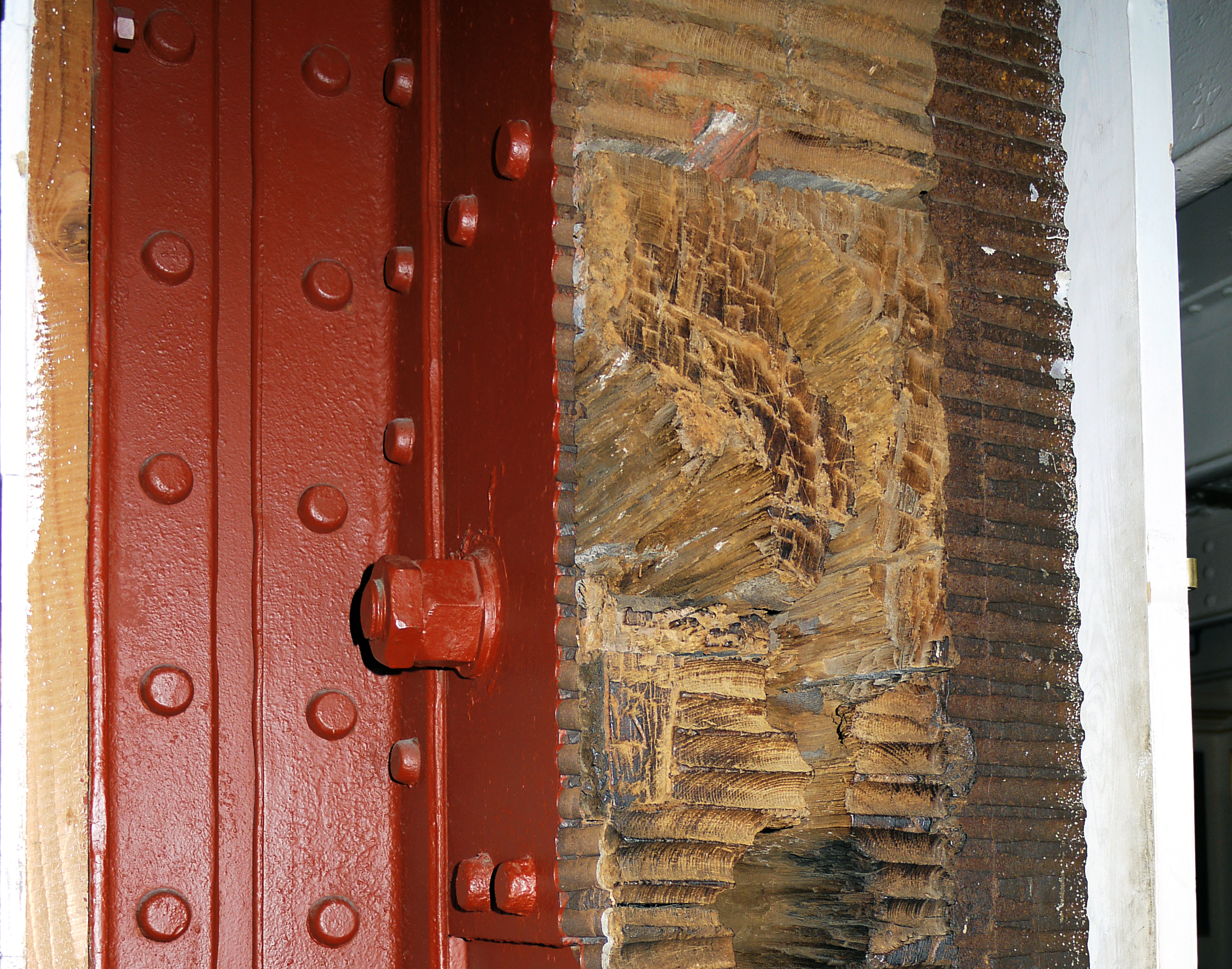
The iron-and-wood armor of Warrior

Iron-built ships used wood as part of their protection scheme. HMS Warrior was protected by 4.5 in (114 mm) of wrought iron backed by 15 in (381 mm) of teak, the strongest shipbuilding wood. The wood played two roles, preventing spalling and also preventing the shock of a hit damaging the structure of the ship. Later, wood and iron were combined in 'sandwich' armor, for instance in HMS Inflexible.

Steel was also an obvious material for armor. It was tested in the 1860s, but the steel of the time was too brittle and disintegrated when struck by shells. Steel became practical to use when a way was found to fuse steel onto wrought iron plates, giving a form of compound armor. This compound armor was used by the British in ships built from the late 1870s, first for turret armor (starting with HMS Inflexible) and then for all armor (starting with HMS Colossus of 1882). The French and German navies adopted the innovation almost immediately, with licenses being given for the use of the 'Wilson System' of producing fused armor.

The first ironclads to have all-steel armor were the two ships of the Duilio class. Though the ships were laid down in 1873 their armor was not purchased from France until 1877. The French navy decided in 1880 to adopt compound armor for its fleet, but found it limited in supply, so from 1884 the French navy was using steel armor. Britain stuck to compound armor until 1889.

The ultimate ironclad armor was case hardened nickel-steel. In 1890, the U.S. Navy tested steel armor hardened by the Harvey process and found it superior to compound armor. For several years 'Harvey steel' was the state of the art, produced in the U.S., France, Germany, Britain, Austria and Italy. In 1894, the German firm Krupp developed gas cementing, which further hardened steel armor. The German Kaiser Friedrich III, laid down in 1895, was the first ship to benefit from the new 'Krupp armor' and the new armor was quickly adopted; the Royal Navy using it from HMS Canopus, laid down in 1896. By 1901 almost all new battleships used Krupp armor, though the U.S. continued to use Harvey armor alongside until the end of the decade.

The equivalent strengths of the different armor plates was as follows: 15 in (381 mm) of wrought iron was equivalent to 12 in (305 mm) of either plain steel or compound iron and steel armor, and to 7.75 in (197 mm) of Harvey armor or 5.75 in (146 mm) of Krupp armor.

Ironclad construction also prefigured the later debate in battleship design between tapering and 'all-or-nothing' armor design. Warrior was only semi-armored, and could have been disabled by hits on the bow and stern. As the thickness of armor grew to protect ships from the increasingly heavy guns, the area of the ship which could be fully protected diminished. Inflexible's armor protection was largely limited to the central citadel amidships, protecting boilers and engines, turrets and magazines, and little else. An ingenious arrangement of cork-filled compartments and watertight bulkheads was intended to keep her stable and afloat in the event of damage to her un-armored sections.

== Propulsion: steam and sail ==
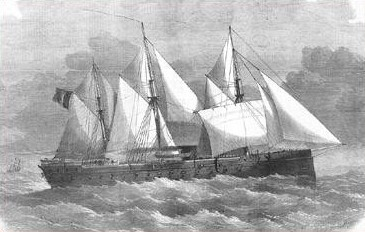
Gloire under sail

The first ocean-going ironclads carried masts and sails like their wooden predecessors, and these features were only gradually abandoned. Early steam engines were inefficient; the wooden steam fleet of the Royal Navy could only carry "5 to 9 days coal", and the situation was similar with the early ironclads. Warrior also illustrates two design features which aided hybrid propulsion; she had retractable screws to reduce drag while under sail (though in practice the steam engine was run at a low throttle), and a telescopic funnel which could be folded down to the deck level.

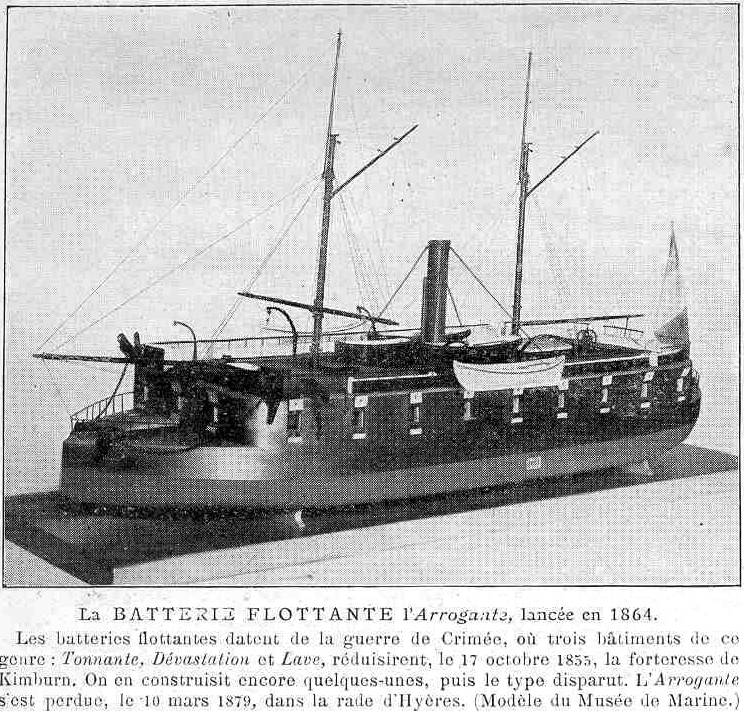
French armored floating battery Arrogante (1864)

Ships designed for coastal warfare, like the floating batteries of the Crimea, or USS Monitor and her sisters, dispensed with masts from the beginning. The British HMS Devastation, started in 1869, was the first large, ocean-going ironclad to dispense with masts. Her principal role was for combat in the English Channel and other European waters; while her coal supplies gave her enough range to cross the Atlantic, she would have had little endurance on the other side of the ocean. The Devastation and the similar ships commissioned by the British and Russian navies in the 1870s were the exception rather than the rule. Most ironclads of the 1870s retained masts, and only the Italian navy, which during that decade was focused on short-range operations in the Adriatic, built consistently mastless ironclads.

During the 1860s, steam engines improved with the adoption of double-expansion steam engines, which used 30–40% less coal than earlier models. The Royal Navy decided to switch to the double-expansion engine in 1871, and by 1875 they were widespread. However, this development alone was not enough to herald the end of the mast. Whether this was due to a conservative desire to retain sails, or was a rational response to the operational and strategic situation, is a matter of debate. A steam-only fleet would require a network of coaling stations worldwide, which would need to be fortified at great expense to stop them falling into enemy hands. Just as significantly, because of unsolved problems with the technology of the boilers which provided steam for the engines, the performance of double-expansion engines was rarely as good in practice as it was in theory.

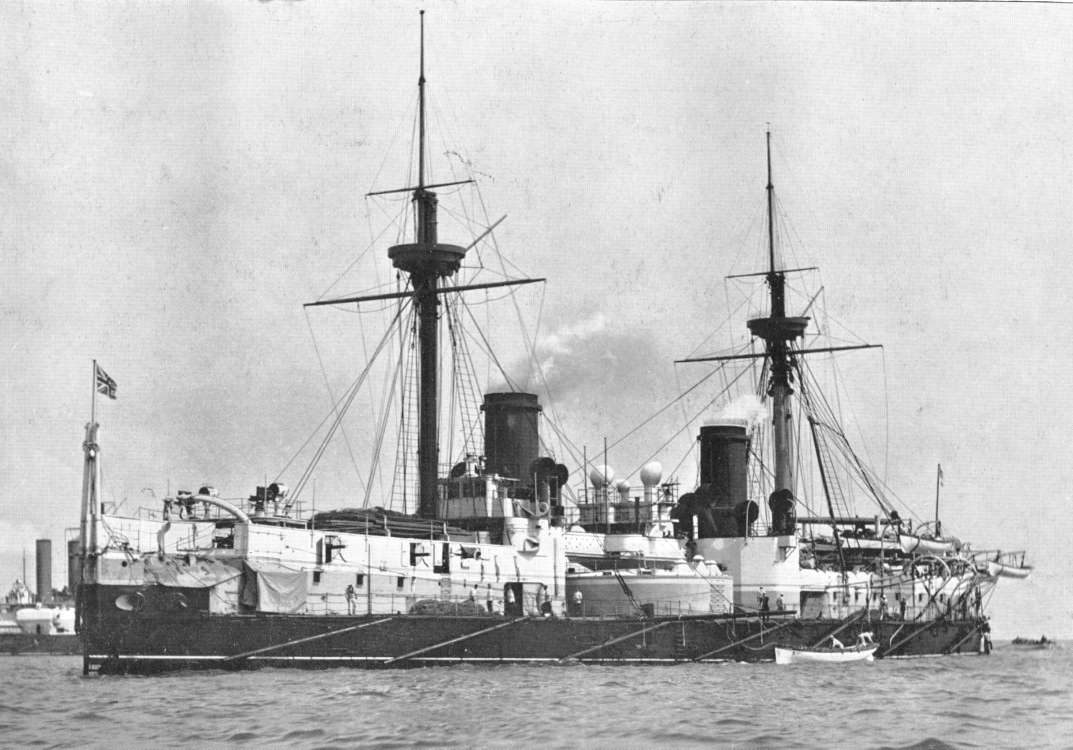
HMS Inflexible, after the replacement of her sailing masts with military masts

During the 1870s the distinction grew between 'first-class ironclads' or 'battleships' on the one hand, and 'cruising ironclads' designed for long-range work on the other. The demands on first-class ironclads for very heavy armor and armament meant increasing displacement, which reduced speed under sail; and the fashion for turrets and barbettes made a sailing rig increasingly inconvenient. HMS Inflexible, launched in 1876 but not commissioned until 1881, was the last British battleship to carry masts, and these were widely seen as a mistake. The start of the 1880s saw the end of sailing rig on ironclad battleships.

Sails persisted on 'cruising ironclads' for much longer. During the 1860s, the French navy had produced the Alma and La Galissonnière classes as small, long-range ironclads as overseas cruisers and the British had responded with ships like HMS Swiftsure of 1870. The Russian ship General-Admiral, laid down in 1870 and completed in 1875, was a model of a fast, long-range ironclad which was likely to be able to outrun and outfight ships like Swiftsure. Even the later HMS Shannon, often described as the first British armored cruiser, would have been too slow to outrun General-Admiral. While Shannon was the last British ship with a retractable propeller, later armored cruisers of the 1870s retained sailing rig, sacrificing speed under steam in consequence. It took until 1881 for the Royal Navy to lay down a long-range armored warship capable of catching enemy commerce raiders, HMS Warspite, which was completed in 1888. While sailing rigs were obsolescent for all purposes by the end of the 1880s, rigged ships were in service until the early years of the 20th century.

The final evolution of ironclad propulsion was the adoption of the triple-expansion steam engine, a further refinement which was first adopted in HMS Sans Pareil, laid down in 1885 and commissioned in 1891. Many ships also used a forced draught to get additional power from their engines, and this system was widely used until the introduction of the steam turbine in the middle of the first decade of the Twentieth Century.

== Fleets ==
While ironclads spread rapidly in navies worldwide, there were few pitched naval battles involving ironclads. Most European nations settled differences on land, and the Royal Navy struggled to maintain a deterrent parity with at least France, while providing suitable protection to Britain's commerce and colonial outposts worldwide. Ironclads remained, for the British Royal Navy, a matter of defending the British Isles first and projecting power abroad second. Those naval engagements of the latter half of the 19th century which involved ironclads normally involved colonial actions or clashes between second-rate naval powers. But these encounters were often enough to convince British policy-makers of the increasing hazards of strictly naval foreign intervention, from Hampton Roads in the American Civil War to the hardening combined defences of naval arsenals such as Kronstadt and Cherbourg.

There were many types of ironclads:

- Seagoing ships intended to "stand in the line of battle"; the precursors of the battleship (Note: This term was still in use in the 1860s and 1870s for what we would now call 'battleships'.)
- Coastal service and riverine vessels, including 'floating batteries' and 'monitors'
- Vessels intended for commerce raiding or protection of commerce, called "armored cruisers"

=== Navies ===
The United Kingdom possessed the largest navy in the world for the whole of the ironclad period. The Royal Navy was the second to adopt ironclad warships, and it applied them worldwide in their whole range of roles. In the age of sail, the British strategy for war depended on the Royal Navy mounting a blockade of the ports of the enemy. Because of the limited endurance of steamships, this was no longer possible, so the British at times considered the risk-laden plan of engaging an enemy fleet in harbor as soon as war broke out. To this end, the Royal Navy developed a series of 'coast-defense battleships', starting with the Devastation class. These 'breastwork monitors' were markedly different from the other high-seas ironclads of the period and were an important precursor of the modern battleship. As long-range monitors they could reach Bermuda unescorted, for example. However, they were still armed with only four heavy guns and were as vulnerable to mines and obstructions (and enemy monitors) as the original monitors of the Union Navy proved to be during the Civil War.

The British prepared for an overwhelming mortar bombardment of Kronstadt by the close of the Crimean War, but never considered running the smoke-ridden, shallow-water gauntlet straight to St. Petersburg with ironclads. Likewise, monitors proved acutely unable to 'overwhelm' enemy fortifications single-handed during the American conflict, though their low-profile and heavy armor protection made them ideal for running artillery gauntlets. Mines and obstructions negated these advantages—a problem the British Admiralty frequently acknowledged but never countered throughout the period. The British never laid down enough Devastation-class 'battleships' to instantly overwhelm Cherbourg, Kronstadt or even New York City with gunfire. Although throughout the 1860s and 1870s the Royal Navy was still in many respects superior to its potential rivals, by the early 1880s widespread concern about the threat from France and Germany culminated in the Naval Defence Act, which promulgated the idea of a 'two-power standard', that Britain should possess as many ships as the next two navies combined. This standard provoked aggressive shipbuilding in the 1880s and 1890s.

British ships did not participate in any major wars in the ironclad period. The Royal Navy's ironclads only saw action as part of colonial battles or one-sided engagements like the bombardment of Alexandria in 1882. Defending British interests against Ahmed 'Urabi's Egyptian revolt, a British fleet opened fire on the fortifications around the port of Alexandria. A mixture of centre-battery and turret ships bombarded Egyptian positions for most of a day, forcing the Egyptians to retreat; return fire from Egyptian guns was heavy at first, but inflicted little damage, killing only five British sailors. Few Egyptian guns were actually dismounted, on the other hand, and the fortifications themselves were typically left intact. Had the Egyptians actually utilised the heavy mortars that were at their disposal, they might have quickly turned the tide, for the attacking British ironclads found it easy (for accuracy's sake) to simply anchor whilst firing—perfect targets for high-angle fire upon their thinly armored topdecks.

The French navy built the first ironclad to try to gain a strategic advantage over the British, but were consistently out-built by the British. Despite taking the lead with a number of innovations like breech-loading weapons and steel construction, the French navy could never match the size of the Royal Navy. In the 1870s, the construction of ironclads ceased for a while in France as the Jeune Ecole school of naval thought took prominence, suggesting that torpedo boats and unarmored cruisers would be the future of warships. Like the British, the French navy saw little action with its ironclads; the French blockade of Germany in the Franco-Prussian War was ineffective, as the war was settled entirely on land.

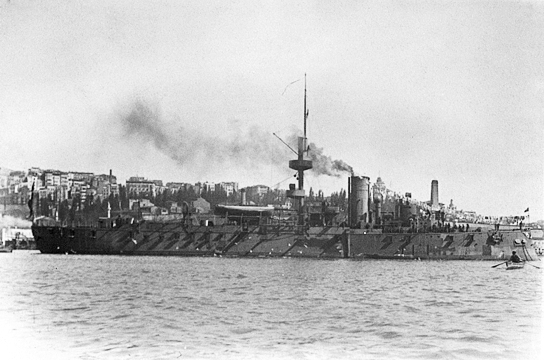
The Ottoman ironclad Asar-i Tewfik saw action in two major wars, the Russo-Turkish War of 1877–1878 and the First Balkan War in 1913

Russia built a number of ironclads, generally copies of British or French designs. Nonetheless, there were real innovations from Russia; the first true type of ironclad armored cruiser, General-Admiral of the 1870s, and a set of unusual but moderately-successful circular battleships referred to as "popovkas" (for Admiral Popov, who conceived the design). The Russian Navy pioneered the wide-scale use of torpedo boats during the Russo-Turkish War of 1877–1878, mainly out of necessity because of the superior numbers and quality of ironclads used by the Ottoman Turkish navy. Russia expanded her navy in the 1880s and 1890s with modern armored cruisers and battleships, but the ships were manned by inexperienced crews and politically appointed leadership, which enhanced their defeat in the Battle of Tsushima on 27 May 1905.

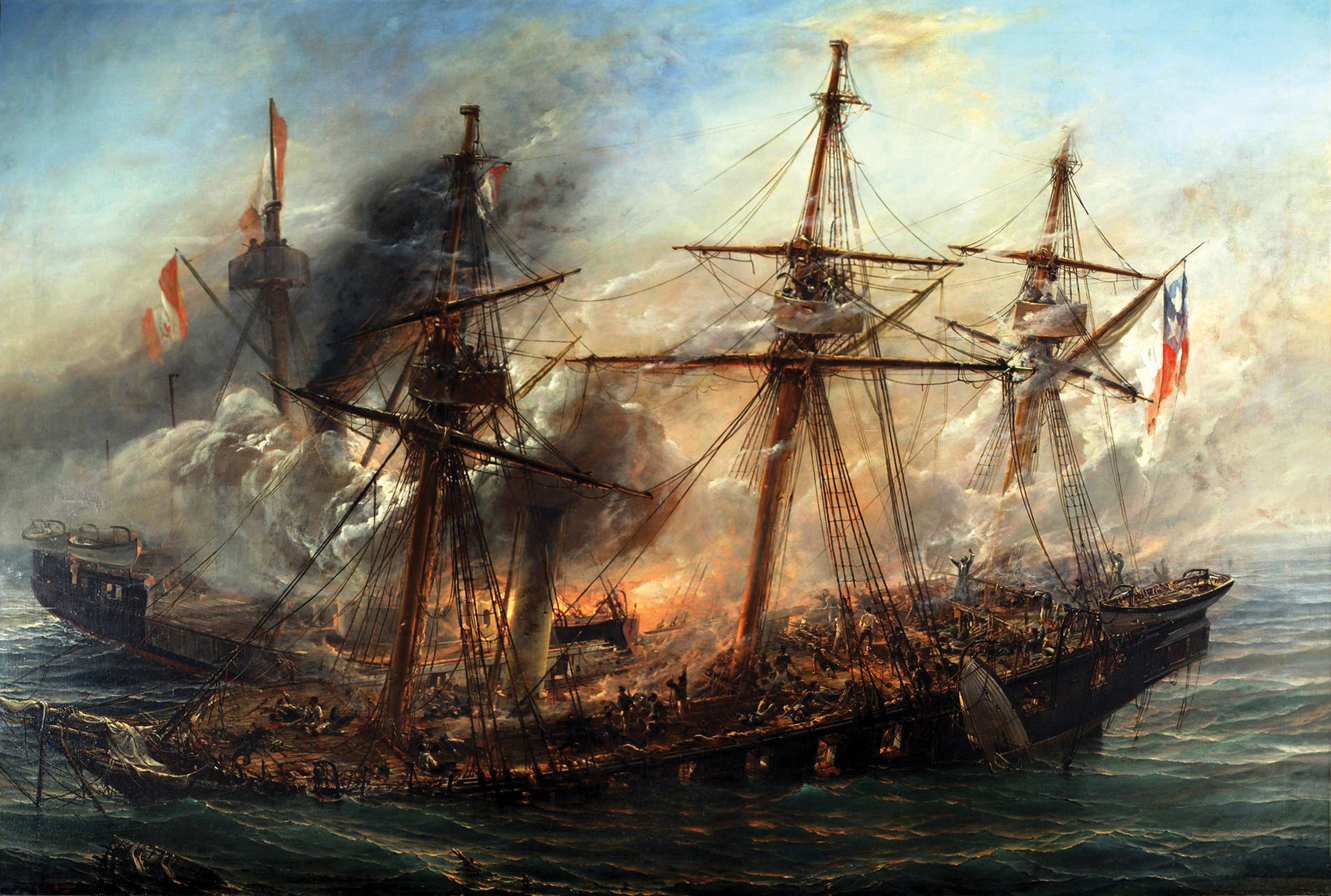
The Battle of Iquique, where Peruvian ironclad Huáscar sank the Chilean wooden corvette Esmeralda

The US Navy ended the Civil War with about fifty monitor-type coastal ironclads; by the 1870s most of these were laid up in reserve, leaving the United States virtually without an ironclad fleet. Another five large monitors were ordered in the 1870s. The limitations of the monitor type effectively prevented the US from projecting power overseas, and until the 1890s the United States would have come off badly in a conflict with even Spain or the Latin American powers. The 1890s saw the beginning of what became the Great White Fleet, and it was the modern pre-Dreadnoughts and armored cruisers built in the 1890s which defeated the Spanish fleet in the Spanish–American War of 1898. This started a new era of naval warfare.

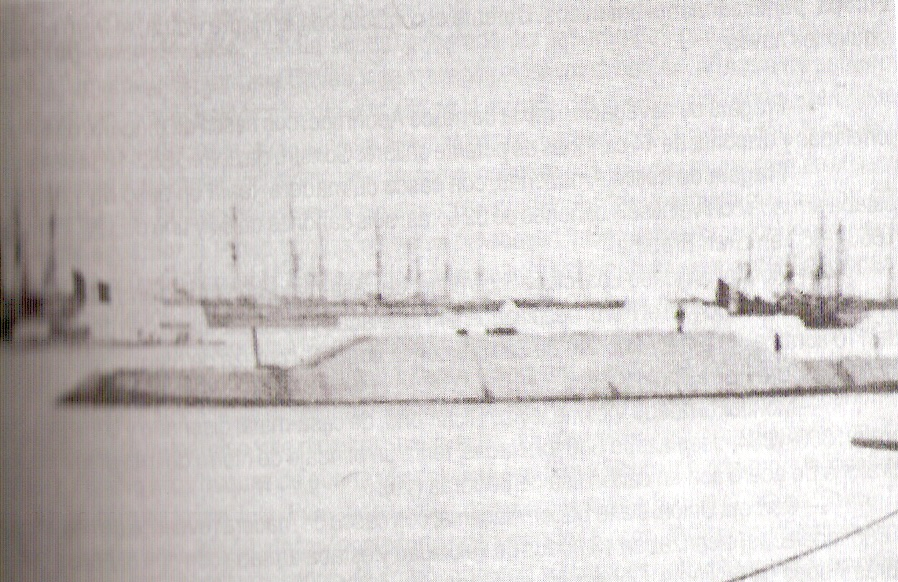
Loa being fitted after its conversion in the Callao harbour, 1864

Ironclads were widely used in South America. Both sides used ironclads in the Chincha Islands War between Spain and the combined forces of Peru and Chile in the early 1860s. The powerful Spanish Numancia participated in the Battle of Callao but was unable to inflict significant damage upon the Callao defences. Besides, Peru was able to deploy two locally built ironclads based on American Civil War designs, Loa (a wooden ship converted into a casemate ironclad) and Victoria (a small monitor armed with a single 68-pdr gun), as well as two British-built ironclads: Independencia, a centre-battery ship, and the turret ship Huáscar. Numancia, was the first ironclad to circumnavigate the world under the command of Juan Bautista Antequera y Bobadilla de Eslava, arriving in Cádiz on 20 September 1867, and earning the motto: "Enloricata navis que primo terram circuivit" ["First ironclad ship to sail around the world"]). In the War of the Pacific in 1879, both Peru and Chile had ironclad warships, including some of those used a few years previously against Spain. While Independencia ran aground early on, the Peruvian ironclad Huáscar made a great impact against Chilean shipping, delaying Chilean ground invasion by six months. She was eventually caught by two more modern Chilean centre-battery ironclads, Blanco Encalada and Almirante Cochrane at the Battle of Angamos Point.

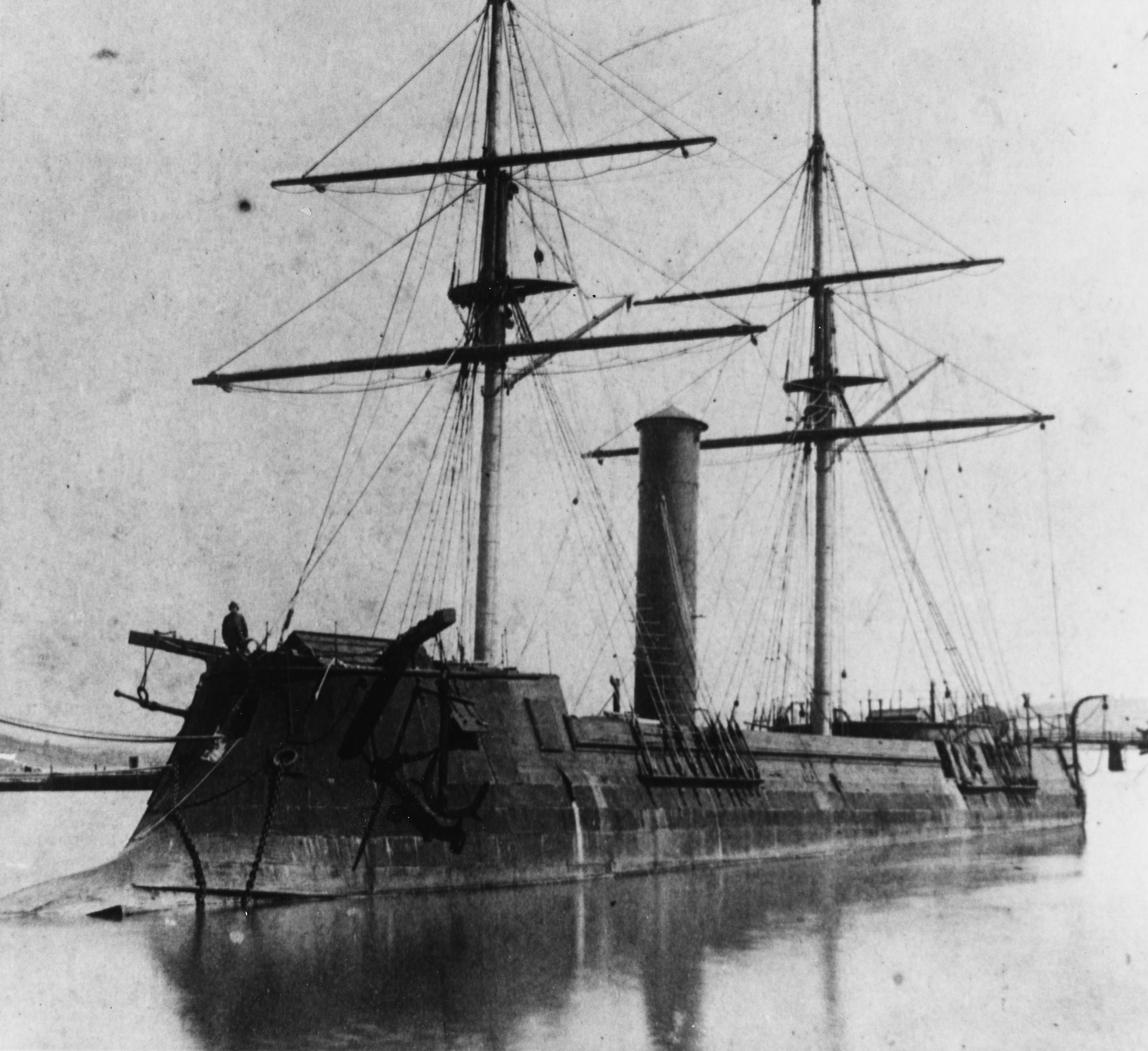
The Confederacy's French-built last ironclad was also Japan's first: Stonewall was later renamed Kōtetsu

Ironclads were also used from the inception of the Imperial Japanese Navy (IJN). Kōtetsu (Japanese: 甲鉄, literally "Ironclad", later renamed Azuma 東, "East") had a decisive role in the Naval Battle of Hakodate Bay in May 1869, which marked the end of the Boshin War, and the complete establishment of the Meiji Restoration. The IJN continued to develop its strength and commissioned a number of warships from British and European shipyards, first ironclads and later armored cruisers. These ships engaged the Chinese Beiyang fleet which was superior on paper at least at the Battle of the Yalu River. Thanks to superior short-range firepower, the Japanese fleet came off better, sinking or severely damaging eight ships and receiving serious damage to only four. The naval war was concluded the next year at the Battle of Weihaiwei, where the strongest remaining Chinese ships were surrendered to the Japanese.

== End of the ironclad warship ==
There is no clearly defined end to the ironclad, besides the transition from wood hulls to all-metal. Ironclads continued to be used in World War I. Towards the end of the 19th century, the descriptions 'battleship' and 'armored cruiser' came to replace the term 'ironclad'.

The proliferation of ironclad battleship designs came to an end in the 1890s as navies reached a consensus on the design of battleships, producing the type known as the pre-dreadnought. These ships are sometimes covered in treatments of the ironclad warship. The next evolution of battleship design, the dreadnought, is never referred to as an 'ironclad'.

=== Legacy ===
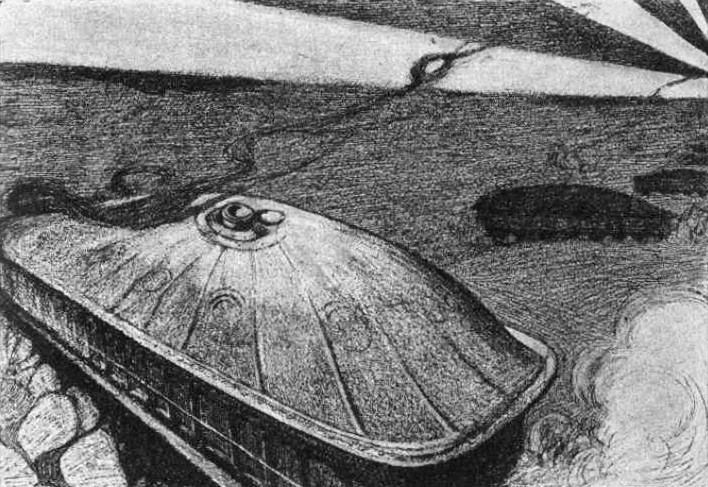
1904 illustration of H.G. Wells' December 1903 The Land Ironclads, showing huge armored land vessels, equipped with Pedrail wheels.

H. G. Wells coined the term The Land Ironclads in a short story published in 1903, to describe fictional large armored fighting vehicles moving on pedrail wheels.

The Ironclad Hotel in the town of Marble Bar, Australia was named after its resemblance to the warships.

A number of ironclads have been preserved or reconstructed as museum ships.

- Parts of USS Monitor have been recovered and are being conserved and displayed at the Mariners' Museum in Newport News, Virginia.
- HMS Warrior is today a fully restored museum ship in Portsmouth, England
- Huáscar is berthed at the port of Talcahuano, Chile, on display for visitors.
- The City-class ironclad USS Cairo is currently on display in Vicksburg, Mississippi.
- Northrop Grumman in Newport News constructed a full-scale replica of USS Monitor. The replica was laid down in February 2005 and completed just two months later.
- The Dutch Ramtorenschip (coastal ram) HNLMS Buffel is currently under display in the Maritime Museum Rotterdam.
- The Dutch Ramtorenschip (coastal ram) HNLMS Schorpioen is a museum ship at Den Helder.
- The complete, recovered wooden hull of CSS Neuse, a casemate ram ironclad, is on view in Kinston, North Carolina, and, in another part of town on the Neuse River, the recreated ship, named CSS Neuse II, is nearly built and can be visited.
- The hull of the casemate ironclad CSS Jackson can be seen in the National Civil War Naval Museum in Columbus, Georgia.
- A replica of the Chinese ironclad Dingyuan was rebuilt in 2003 as a floating museum at Weihai.
- HMVS Cerberus, built 1867, has been partially sunk as a breakwater in Victoria, Australia, but is not preserved and is deteriorating in the elements.

== See also ==
- List of ironclads

== Bibliography ==
- Archibald, E.H.H. (1984). The Fighting Ship in the Royal Navy 1897–1984. Blandford. ISBN 0-7137-1348-8.
- Ballard, G. A. (1980). The Black Battlefleet. Annapolis, Maryland: Naval Institute Press. ISBN 0-87021-924-3.
- Baxter, James Phinney III (2001) [1933]. The Introduction of the Ironclad Warship. Classics of Naval Literature. Annapolis, Maryland: Naval Institute Press. ISBN 1-55750-218-8.
- Beeler, John (2003). Birth of the Battleship: British Capital Ship Design 1870–1881. London: Caxton. ISBN 1-84067-534-9. OCLC 52358324.
- Brook, Peter; Beasecker, Robert; Lee, Anthony J. & Millar, Steve (2001). "Question 39/00: British Bombardment of Alexandria". Warship International. XXXVIII (4): 331–332. ISSN 0043-0374.
- Brown, David K. (2015). Before the Ironclad: Warship Design and Development 1815–1860. Annapolis, Maryland: Naval Institute Press. ISBN 978-1-59114-605-6.
- Brown, David K. (1992). "The Era of Uncertainty". In Gardiner, Robert (ed.). Steam, Steel and Shellfire: The Steam Warship 1815–1905. Conway's History of the Ship. London: Conway Maritime Press. pp. 75–94. ISBN 1-55750-774-0.
- Brown, David K. (1997). Warrior to Dreadnought: Warship Development, 1860–1905. London: Chatham Publishing. ISBN 1-86176-022-1.
- Campbell, John (1992). "Naval Armaments and Armour". In Gardiner, Robert (ed.). Steam, Steel and Shellfire: The Steam Warship 1815–1905. Conway's History of the Ship. London: Conway Maritime Press. pp. 158–169. ISBN 1-55750-774-0.
- Canney, Donald L. (2015). The Confederate Steam Navy 1861–1865. Atglen, Pennsylvania: Schiffer Publishing. ISBN 978-0-7643-4824-2.
- Canney, Donald L. (1993). The Old Steam Navy. Vol. 2: The Ironclads, 1842–1885. Annapolis, Maryland: Naval Institute Press. ISBN 0-87021-586-8.
- Fuller, Howard J. (2008). Clad in Iron: The American Civil War and the Challenge of British Naval Power. Westport, Connecticut: Praeger Security International. ISBN 0-313-34590-2. OCLC 171549041.
- Fuller, Howard J. (2020). Turret Versus Broadside: An Anatomy of British Naval Prestige, Revolution and Disaster 1860–1870. Wolverhampton Military Studies. Warwick, UK: Helion. ISBN 978-1-913336-22-6.
- Greene, Jack & Massignani, Alessandro (1998). Ironclads at War: The Origin and Development of the Armored Warship, 1854–1891. Conshohocken, Pennsylvania: Combined Publishing. ISBN 0-938289-58-6.
- Griffiths, Denis (1992). "Warship Machinery". In Gardiner, Robert (ed.). Steam, Steel and Shellfire: The Steam Warship 1815–1905. Conway's History of the Ship. London: Conway Maritime Press. pp. 170–178. ISBN 1-55750-774-0.
- Hill, J. Richard, Rear Admiral (2000). War at Sea in the Ironclad age. London: Cassell. ISBN 0-304-35273-X.
- Jentschura, Hansgeorg; Jung, Dieter & Mickel, Peter (1977). Warships of the Imperial Japanese Navy, 1869–1945. Annapolis, Maryland: United States Naval Institute. ISBN 0-87021-893-X.
- Kennedy, Paul M. (1985). The Rise and Fall of British Naval Mastery. Houndmills, UK: Macmillan. ISBN 0-333-35094-4.
- Conway's All the World's Fighting Ships 1860–1905. Roger Chesneau, Eugène M. Koleśnik, N. J. M. Campbell (1st American ed.). New York: Mayflower Books. 1979. ISBN 0-8317-0302-4. OCLC 4775646.
- Lambert, Andrew (1984). Battleships in Transition: The Creation of the Steam Battlefleet 1815–1860. London: Conway Maritime Press. ISBN 0-85177-315-X.
- Lambert, Andrew (1992). "Iron Hulls and Armour Plate". In Gardiner, Robert (ed.). Steam, Steel and Shellfire: The Steam Warship 1815–1905. Conway's History of the Ship. London: Conway Maritime Press. pp. 47–60. ISBN 1-55750-774-0.
- Lambert, Andrew (1992). "The Screw Propeller Warship". In Gardiner, Robert (ed.). Steam, Steel and Shellfire: The Steam Warship 1815–1905. Conway's History of the Ship. London: Conway Maritime Press. pp. 30–46. ISBN 1-55750-774-0.
- Langensiepen, Bernd & Güleryüz, Ahmet (1995). The Ottoman Steam Navy 1828–1923. London: Conway Maritime Press. ISBN 978-0-85177-610-1.
- Noel, Gerard et al. The Gun, Ram and Torpedo, Manoeuvres and Tactics of a Naval Battle of the Present Day. 2nd edition, pub. Griffin 1885. OCLC 57209664.
- Northrop Grumman Newport News, Northrop Grumman Employees Reconstruct History with USS Monitor Replica. Retrieved 2007-05-21.
- Parkes, Oscar (1990) [1957]. British Battleships. Annapolis, Maryland: Naval Institute Press. ISBN 1-55750-075-4.
- Quarstein, John V. (2006). A History of Ironclads: The Power of Iron Over Wood. Charleston, South Carolina: History Press. ISBN 978-1-59629-118-8.
- Reed, Edward J. (1869). Our Ironclad Ships, their Qualities, Performance and Cost. John Murray.
- Roberts, John (1992). "Warships of Steel 1879–1889". In Gardiner, Robert (ed.). Steam, Steel and Shellfire: The Steam Warship 1815–1905. Conway's History of the Ship. London: Conway Maritime Press. pp. 95–111. ISBN 1-55750-774-0.
- Roberts, Stephen (2021). French Warships in the Age of Steam 1859–1914. Barnsley, UK: Seaforth. ISBN 978-1-5267-4533-0.
- Sandler, Stanley (2004). Battleships: An Illustrated History of Their Impact. ABC-CLIO. ISBN 1-8510-9410-5.
- Sandler, Stanley (1979). Emergence of the Modern Capital Ship. Newark, Delaware: Associated University Presses. ISBN 0-87413-119-7. OCLC 4498820.
- Silverstone, Paul H. (1984). Directory of the World's Capital Ships. New York: Hippocrene Books. ISBN 0-88254-979-0.
- Sondhaus, Lawrence (2001). Naval Warfare 1815–1914. London: Routledge. ISBN 0-415-21478-5.
- Still, William N. (1992). "The American Civil War". In Gardiner, Robert (ed.). Steam, Steel and Shellfire: The Steam Warship 1815–1905. Conway's History of the Ship. London: Conway Maritime Press. pp. 61–74. ISBN 1-55750-774-0.
- Wilson, H. W. (1995) [1926]. Battleships in Action. Vol. 1. Annapolis, Maryland: Naval Institute Press. ISBN 1-55750-061-4.
- Winfield, Rif & Lyon, David (2004). The Sail and Steam Navy List: All the Ships of the Royal Navy 1815–1889. London: Chatham Publishing. ISBN 978-1-86176-032-6. OCLC 52620555.
