= Ironclad Hotel =

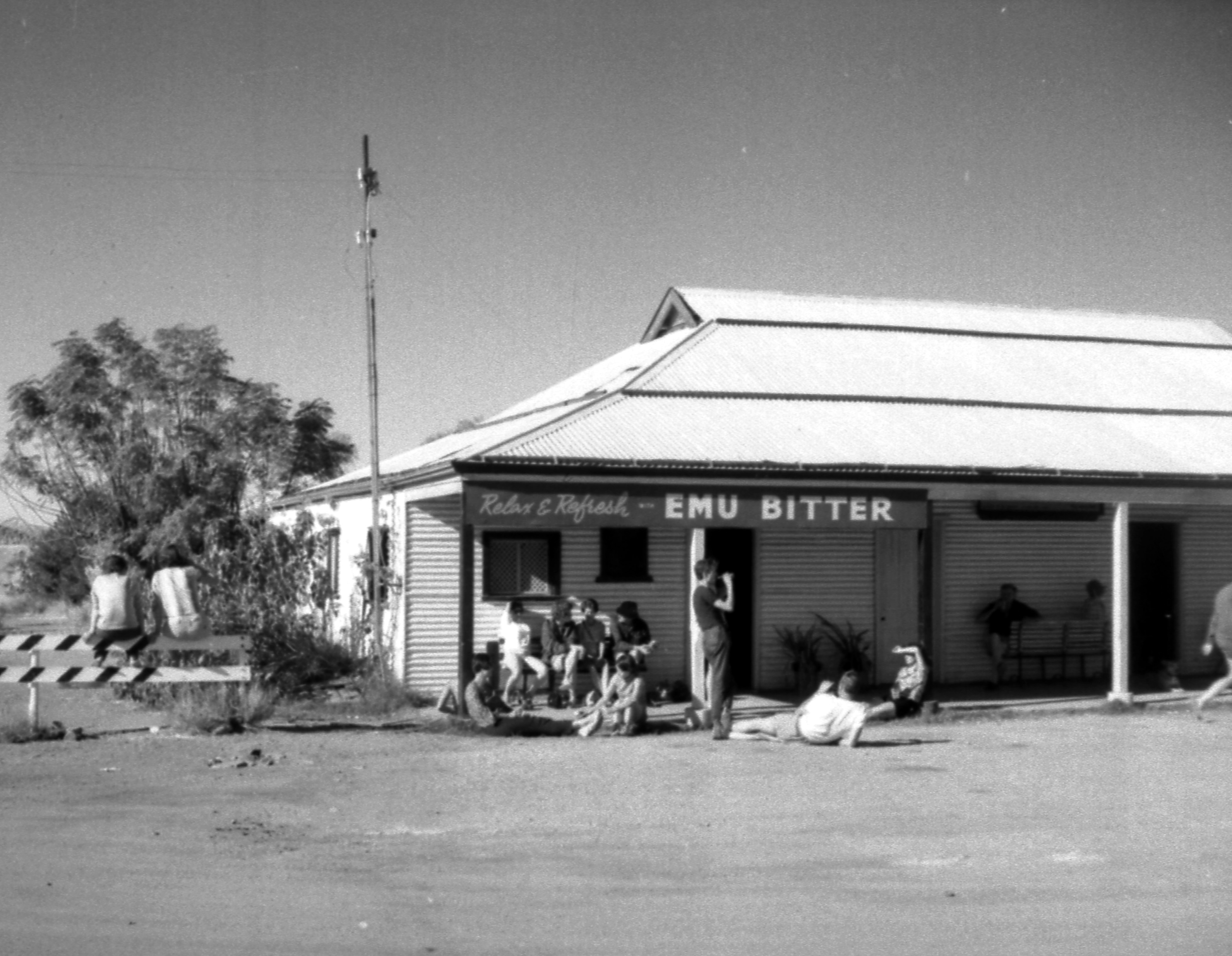
- The pub in 1969

- Location within Western Australia

General information
- Type: Australian pub
- Location: Marble Bar, Pilbara, Western Australia
- Coordinates: 21°10′17″S 119°44′41″E

Western Australia Heritage Register
- Designated: 17 November 2006
- Reference no.: 3954

The Ironclad Hotel is an Australian pub in Marble Bar in the Pilbara region of Western Australia. Built in the 1890s, it became notorious as the only pub in what was considered the hottest town in Australia, having a weather record that was unchallenged in the 1940s to the 1960s, and only surpassed in new mining towns developed after that time.

By the 1900s, it was able to utilise a power source.

The hotel was constructed of corrugated iron.

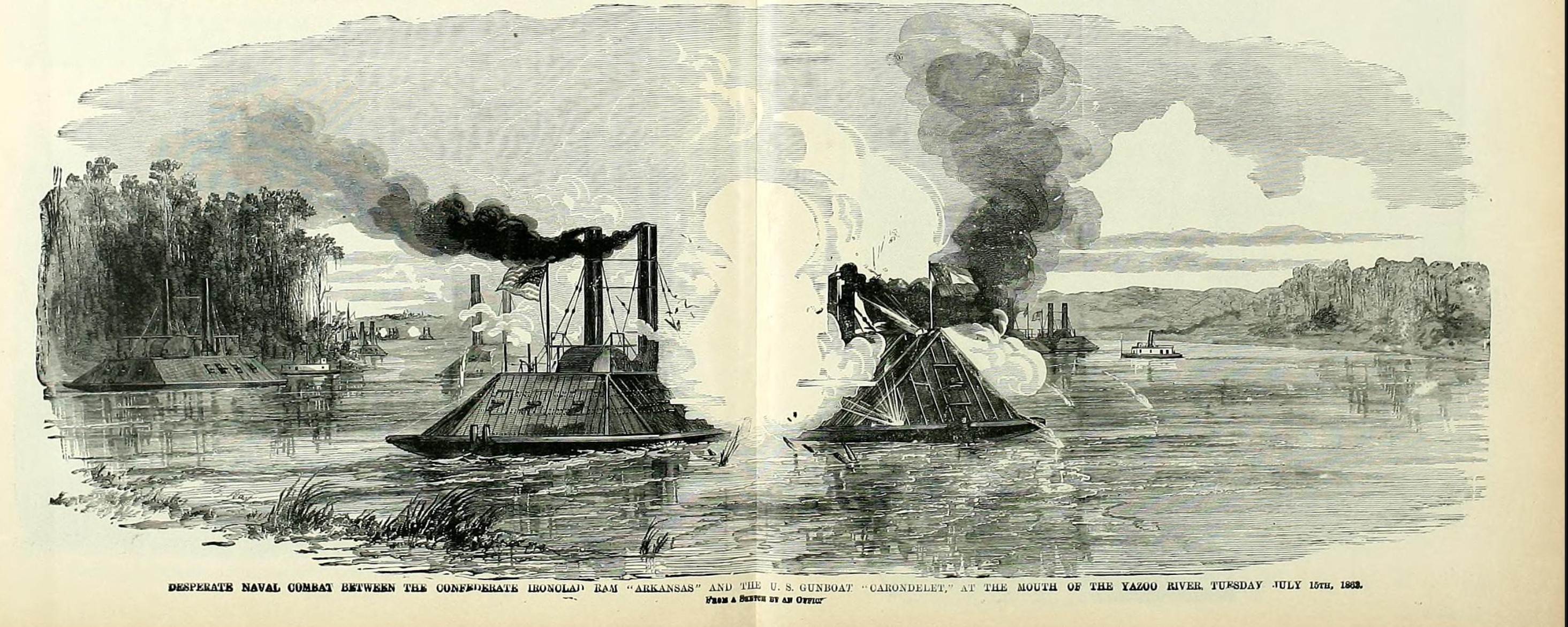
A drawing of the confederate ironclad ram CSS Arkansas in 1863

It was allegedly given the name by American miners who were reminded of the ironclad warships of the United States navy. Also during the Second World War, American servicemen were located in or near Marble Bar due to the Corunna Downs Airfield. Ownership and management changed regularly over time. In 1901, the owners were Cooper and Blanton.

In the 1930s, the owners of the hotel raised accommodation rates that gained publicity for a 'beer strike' by those affected. At different stages of its history, the hotel attracted questions as to its conditions, with licensing boards having hearings where conditions were noted that required improvements. In 1949, the residential section was burnt down. When the hotel was up for sale in the 1970s, a calculation was made that the bar sales included: -

1350 litres (15x 18 gallon kegs) and 140 bottles and stubbies were sold per week in a population of 500 people.

In a memoir, British businessman Alistair McAlpine (1942–2014) wrote of a visit to the hotel in 1996: "...and the Iron Clad Hotel, made of corrugated iron. The Iron Clad is just a pub; the guest rooms are transportable buildings parked nearby. The town's name does not refer to the material used to make the pub's bar – this is solid jarrah, not local marble."

In the 2000s, a short supply of beer caught media attention.

In 2006, the Ironclad hotel was listed on the Western Australian register of heritage places. In 2011 a conservation plan was produced.
