= Corunna Downs Station =

Pastoral lease in Western Australia

- Location within Western Australia

General information
- Type: Station
- Location: 34 kilometres (21 mi) south of Marble Bar, Pilbara, Western Australia
- Coordinates: 21°27′49″S 119°50′35″E

Western Australia Heritage Register
- Designated: 30 March 2007
- Reference no.: 3695

Corunna Downs Station is a pastoral lease that was once a sheep station but now operates as a cattle station in Western Australia.

It is located approximately 34 kilometres (21 mi) south of Marble Bar and 180 km (112 mi) south east of Port Hedland in the Pilbara region of Western Australia. Several watercourses run through the property, including Coongan River, Emu, Sandy, and Badgeyong Creeks, which also contain several permanent pools of water. The landscape is mostly flat spinifex country.

The lease was first taken up by John Withnell and William McLean in July 1886. The Mackay brothers, along with Donald and Roderick Louden, took up a holding in 1887. The Mackays' lease consisted of three parcels of 20,000 acres (8,094 ha) each. In 1890, George Dudley and Alfred Howden Drake-Brockman took up land on what is now Mount Edgar Station. Howden selected the Corunna Downs land and named it after the Battle of Corunna. The leases of the Withnells and Mackays were registered to Dalgety & Company and worked by the Brockman brothers.

In 1916 the property produced over 147 bales of wool, and 105 were produced in 1920.

The 305,593-acre (123,669 ha) property was made up of 13 separate leases that were combined into a single lease in 1924 when it was acquired by Ernest Samuel Foulkes-Taylor. Taylor had previously held Glenorn Station, near Malcolm, with his younger brother Charlie. In 1924 Corunna Downs was still a fully operational sheep station carrying 20,000 head of sheep, 350 cattle, 125 horses, 175 donkeys, and 8 camels.

In 1942 the Royal Australian Air Force built a secret airbase on the station, adjacent to the 1891 homestead. Two bitumen runways of over 1,500 m and 2,000 m were constructed, for use by long-range B-24 Liberator bombers.

In 2015 the property occupied an area of 214,698 hectares (530,530 acres) and was stocked with 4,800 head of shorthorn and droughtmaster cattle.

The property features in Sally Morgan's book My Place, as her grandmother Daisy was born there.

== Heritage significance ==
The Heritage Council of Western Australia has listed the Corunna Downs Station and Former Wartime Airbase as culturally significant sites.

== See also ==
- List of ranches and stations
- List of pastoral leases in Western Australia
