= USS Mahopac =

USS Mahopac may refer to the following ships operated by the United States Navy:

- USS Mahopac (1864), was an armored monitor launched 17 May 1864 and sold 25 March 1902
- USS Mahopac (AT-29), was a tugboat launched 27 May 1919 and decommissioned 12 September 1946
- USS Mahopac (ATA-196), was a tugboat originally launched as ATA-196 21 December 1944, renamed Mahopac 16 July 1948 and transferred to Taiwan in 1976
