= Corunna Downs Airfield =

Former secret Royal Australian Air Force base in Western Australia

Corunna Downs Airfield
- Marble Bar, Pilbara, Western Australia in Australia

Site information
- Type: Airbase
- Owner: Australian Air Board
- Operator: Royal Australian Air Force
- Controlled by: No. 73 Operational Base Unit RAAF
- Open to the public: Yes
- Condition: Poor

Location
- Shown within Western Australia Corunna Downs Airfield (Australia)
- Coordinates: 21°26′00″S 119°46′58″E

Site history
- Built: 1942
- In use: until 14 January 1946
- Fate: Abandoned
- Battles/wars: Pacific War
- Events: Long range missions against Japanese shipping and base facilities in the Dutch East Indies

Garrison information
- Occupants: Australia: No. 24 Squadron RAAF; No. 25 Squadron RAAF; United States: 380th Bomb Group (Fifth Air Force, USAAF)

Airfield information
Runways
Direction	Length and surface
NS	5,000 ft × 150 ft (1,524 m × 46 m) Dirt
EW	7,000 ft × 150 ft (2,134 m × 46 m) Dirt

Corunna Downs Station and Former Wartime Airbase
- Brockman's Station
- Location: Salgash Corunna Downs Road, East Pilbara, Pilbara
- Nearest city: Marble Bar

History
- Built: 1942
- Built for: Royal Australian Air Force
- Original use: Military base

Site notes
- Current use: Public use

Western Australia Heritage Register
- Designated: 26 May 2006
- Reference no.: 3695

Corunna Downs Airfield was a secret Royal Australian Air Force (RAAF) base at Corunna Downs, 40 km (25 mi) south of Marble Bar in the Pilbara region of Western Australia during World War II.

== History ==
In 1942 the RAAF built a secret airbase on Corunna Downs Station, adjacent to the 1891 Brockman’s homestead. The airfield, created especially for Consolidated B-24 Liberator long-range heavy bombers, comprised two intersecting bitumen runways, a north–south (165°) runway 5,000 ft × 150 ft (1,524 m × 46 m) and an east–west (107°) runway 7,000 ft × 150 ft (2,134 m × 46 m). No. 73 Operational Base Unit was responsible for operating the airfield during World War II. Based in Corunna Downs Airfield, RAAF No. 24 Squadron, No 25 Squadron and the United States Army Air Corps 380th Bomb Group flew long range missions against Japanese shipping and base facilities in the Dutch East Indies. When World War II ended, the airfield was abandoned and never operational since.

== See also ==
- List of airports in Western Australia
