= Marble Bar, Western Australia =

Town in Western Australia

Marble Bar
- Town
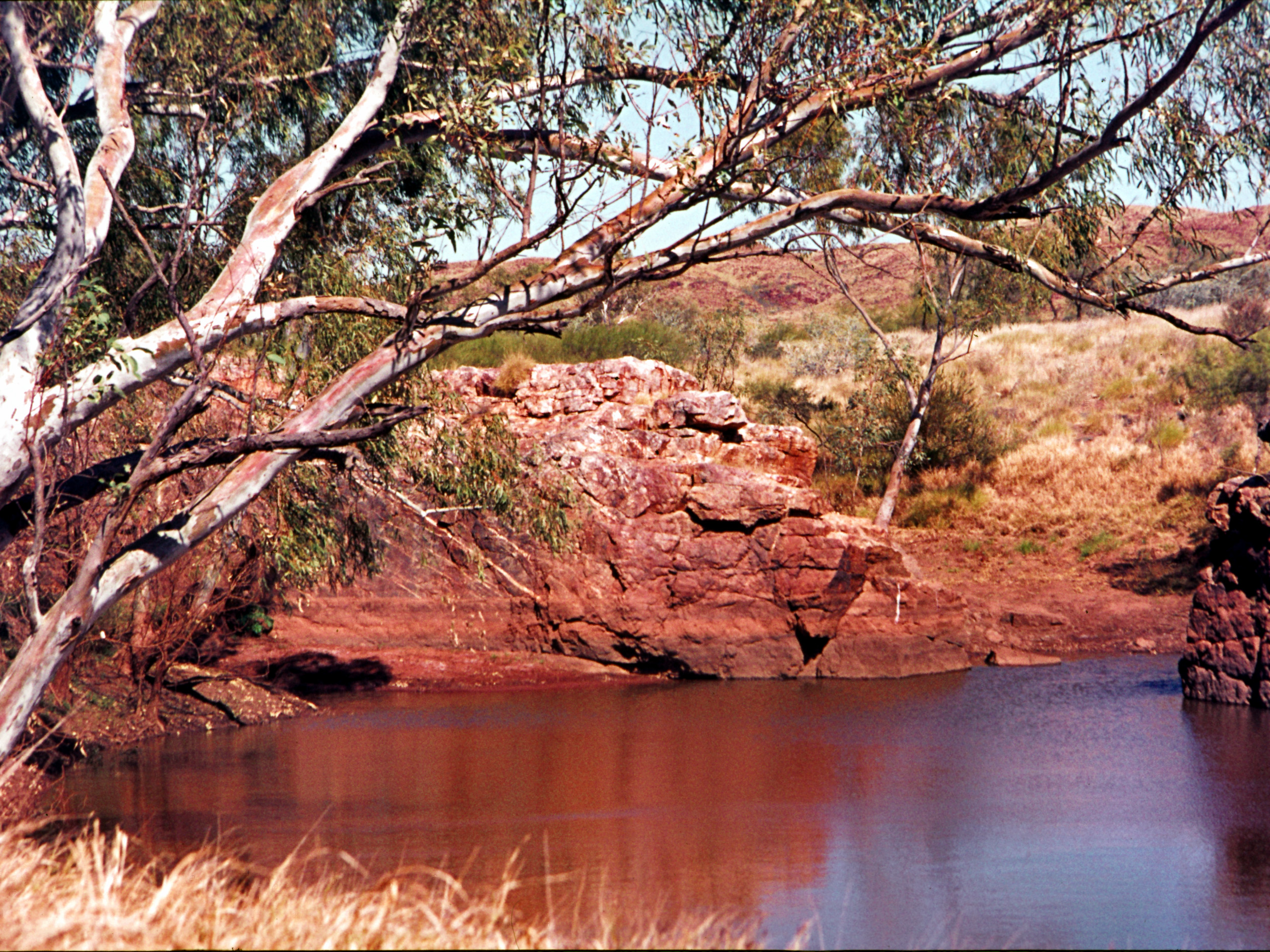
- Chinaman's Pool, 1976

- Interactive map of Marble Bar
- Coordinates: 21°10′12″S 119°44′49″E
- Country: Australia
- State: Western Australia
- LGA: Shire of East Pilbara
- Location: 1,476 km (917 mi) north east of Perth; 152 km (94 mi) south east of Port Hedland; 242 km (150 mi) north of Newman
- Established: 1893

Government
  - State electorate: Pilbara
  - Federal division: Durack

Area
  - Total: 35,032.9 km^{2} (13,526.3 sq mi)
- Elevation: 178 m (584 ft)

Population
  - Total: 927 (SAL 2021)
- Postcode: 6760
- Mean max temp: 35.3 °C (95.5 °F)
- Mean min temp: 19.9 °C (67.8 °F)
- Annual rainfall: 361.7 mm (14.24 in)

Marble Bar is a town and rock formation in the Pilbara region of north-western Western Australia. It was the social centre of European settlers in the Pilbara region during the early 1900s, predating the construction of other towns now established.

The town is additionally noted for its extremely hot climate, having a mean maximum temperature second in Australia only to Wyndham.

It has also been noted for some palaeontological findings in its surroundings. Fossilised stromatolites found nearby (one of the earliest forms of life on Earth) have been dated to the Paleoarchean era approximately 3.5 billion years ago.

== History ==
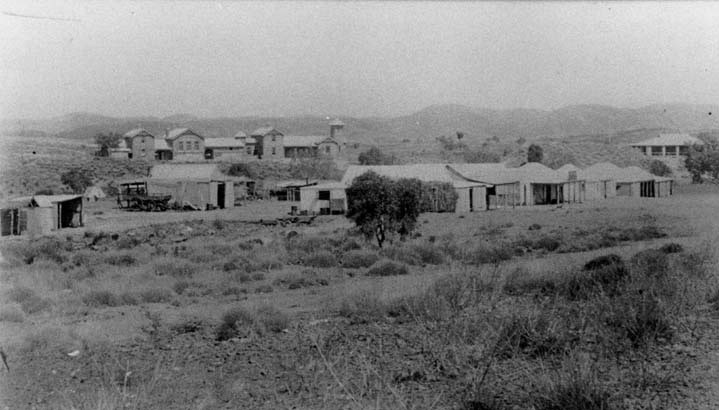
Marble Bar town, 1898

Marble Bar has been described as "the centre of the Pilbara back in the early 1900s". The town predates Port Hedland, Newman, and Karratha.

It was gazetted in 1893 following the discovery of gold in the area in 1890 by a prospector named Francis Jenkins who is remembered by the name of the town's main street. The name Marble Bar was derived from a nearby jasper bar mistaken for marble and now known as Marble Bar, which runs across the bed of the Coongan River.

In 1891, the town boasted a population in excess of 5,000 as it experienced a rush on the goldfields. Several large gold nuggets were discovered as a result of the goldrush. The 333 ounce Little Hero nugget, the 413 ounce Bobby Dazzler and the 332 ounce General Gordon nugget were all found in the goldfields around the town.

By 1895, the town had its Government offices built; these are now National Trust buildings. Cut from local stone, the buildings still stand today. The town's Ironclad Hotel was built in the 1890s, and has been listed on the Western Australian register of heritage places since 2006. It is constructed of corrugated iron, and was given its name by American miners who were reminded of the ironclad ships of the United States navy.

A telegraph line was proposed during discussion of the Estimates in January 1893 to link Condon to Marble Bar. After approval, many basic administrative errors delayed or interrupted construction of the line to an area in which very significant gold finds were being mined. These mines needed communication with other centres – including to England. Finally the line was completed at the end of July 1894 - to the satisfaction of an increasingly irate community. A Post and Telegraph Office was opened on 25 August 1894.

During World War II, United States Army Air Forces and Royal Australian Air Force heavy bombers were based 25 kilometres (16 mi) away as the crow flies at Corunna Downs Airfield. Allied airmen from the base attacked Japanese forces as far away as Borneo.

The Port Hedland to Marble Bar Railway opened on 15 July 1911, costing around £300,000 to build. Due to low traffic and high financial losses, the railway closed from 31 May 1951. This railway could be seen as a narrow gauge precursor to the network of standard gauge iron-ore railways that have since been created across the Pilbara.

In a 2002 memoir, British businessman Alistair McAlpine (1942–2014) described staying a night in the town as part of a journey to find outback wildflowers:

By early evening you arrive at Marble Bar - a small town that was the administrative centre for a once-prosperous region. Now all it boasts are large red-brick barracks, built in the form of a decorative castle, and the Iron Clad Hotel, made of corrugated iron (...) After your disturbed night in Marble Bar, the reason the Iron Clad has so few bedrooms becomes apparent: visitors drink most of the night and sleep where they drop. September is the perfect time to stay in Marble Bar, for the temperature is pleasant in a place where its range is enormous. In winter, the drunks try to share your cabin if the door is not locked. In summer, if you lock the door, you suffocate.

== Climate ==
Marble Bar has a hot desert climate (Köppen BWh) with sweltering summers and warm winters. Most of the annual rainfall occurs in the summer. The town set a world record of most consecutive days at or above 100 °F (37.8 °C): 160 days from 31 October 1923 to 7 April 1924. Although annual temperatures indicate Marble Bar should be within the tropics, with a July (winter) mean of 19 °C (66 °F), it does not have the high precipitation requirements for hot-weather climates to sustain tropical vegetation.

During December and January, temperatures in excess of 45 °C (113 °F) are common, and the average maximum temperature exceeds normal human body temperature for six months each year. Marble Bar receives 159.6 clear days annually. Dewpoint in the summers is between 10 and 15 °C (50 and 59 °F). In contrast to most of the year, winters are warm, with days averaging 27 °C (81 °F), low humidity and clear skies. Nights from June to August can be chilly, occasionally as low as 5 °C (41 °F) but frost is unknown. Even in mid winter however, brief bursts of heat can result in the temperature rising as high as 35 °C (95 °F) for a few days before dropping back to normal.

Rainfall is sparse and erratic, though variability is significantly less extreme than over the coastal Pilbara – the tenth percentile being 190.9 millimetres (7.52 in) vis-à-vis only 67.4 millimetres (2.65 in) in Onslow. It falls largely between December and March, with occasional rain events from autumn northwest cloudbands up to June. As little as 71.1 mm (2.80 in) can fall in a year; however, during heavy wet seasons when the monsoon reaches well south into the Pilbara, the rainfall can be significantly more – as much as 927.1 millimetres (36.50 in) fell between April 1999 and March 2000, and 797.9 mm (31.41 in) fell in 1980 owing to several tropical cyclones. The most rain recorded in a month is 417.4 mm (16.43 in) in March 2007, and the most in one day 304.8 millimetres (12.00 in) on 2 March 1941.

Climate data for Marble Bar, Western Australia
Month	Jan	Feb	Mar	Apr	May	Jun	Jul	Aug	Sep	Oct	Nov	Dec	Year
Record high °C (°F)	49.2 (120.6)	48.3 (118.9)	47.4 (117.3)	45.0 (113.0)	39.5 (103.1)	35.8 (96.4)	35.0 (95.0)	39.7 (103.5)	42.6 (108.7)	46.0 (114.8)	47.2 (117.0)	49.3 (120.7)	49.3 (120.7)
Mean daily maximum °C (°F)	41.0 (105.8)	39.8 (103.6)	39.0 (102.2)	36.0 (96.8)	30.7 (87.3)	27.1 (80.8)	26.8 (80.2)	29.6 (85.3)	33.9 (93.0)	37.6 (99.7)	40.5 (104.9)	41.6 (106.9)	35.3 (95.5)
Mean daily minimum °C (°F)	26.1 (79.0)	25.7 (78.3)	24.8 (76.6)	21.4 (70.5)	16.6 (61.9)	13.2 (55.8)	11.7 (53.1)	13.3 (55.9)	16.7 (62.1)	20.3 (68.5)	23.6 (74.5)	25.5 (77.9)	19.9 (67.8)
Record low °C (°F)	17.9 (64.2)	13.9 (57.0)	15.0 (59.0)	10.0 (50.0)	5.6 (42.1)	1.1 (34.0)	2.2 (36.0)	3.9 (39.0)	5.6 (42.1)	10.0 (50.0)	14.4 (57.9)	17.0 (62.6)	1.1 (34.0)
Average rainfall mm (inches)	76.3 (3.00)	87.8 (3.46)	56.7 (2.23)	21.9 (0.86)	23.0 (0.91)	23.0 (0.91)	12.6 (0.50)	6.4 (0.25)	0.9 (0.04)	3.8 (0.15)	9.1 (0.36)	39.6 (1.56)	361.1 (14.23)
Average rainy days (≥ 0.2 mm)	7.4	7.7	4.9	1.9	2.4	2.3	1.5	0.9	0.3	0.6	1.5	4.6	36
Average afternoon relative humidity (%)	26	31	26	23	27	28	24	21	17	16	16	20	23
Source: Australian Bureau of Meteorology

== Geological history ==
Fossilised stromatolites, found near Marble Bar, are one of the earliest forms of life on Earth, dating to 3.5 billion years ago during the Paleoarchean era, when at that time oxygen produced aerobic organisms.

A location nearby is known as North Pole (21° 05' S. 119° 22' E.). The location's rock formations contain stromatolites in particular rock sequences, which some scientists have considered evidence that puts the origin of life on earth back to 3,400–3,500 million years ago.

This has been a subject of long scientific debate. The biologic explanation has been disputed with the argument that stromatolites older than 3,200 mya are not the result of living organisms (the definition of stromatolites includes both living and abiotic causes), the small conical structures in the Strelley Pool formation (Warrawoona Group) being formed by evaporation and a dome structure from the North Pole chert (also Warrawoona Group) being formed by soft-sediment deformation.

Research by Abigail Allwood on the geology of the North Pole stromatolite reef appears to confirm the biologic origins of patterns in the formation. Continuing support for their geologic origin, following the 2006 publication of her team's results in Nature led to further investigations and Allwood's development of the PIXL technology at the NASA Jet Propulsion Laboratory, for use in confirming her earlier conclusions. Use of PIXL, together with the insight gained into the organic processes that can build geologic formations, are key components of the Mars 2020 Mission.

== See also ==
- List of weather records
- Pilbara historical timeline
- Pilbara newspapers
- Royal Commission into British nuclear tests in Australia
- Warrawoona Group – in relation to North Pole findings
