= Iron ore mining in Western Australia =

Mining in Western Australia

- Position of Western Australia within Australia highlighted

Location
- State: Western Australia
- Country: Australia

Regulatory authority
- Authority: Department of Mines, Industry Regulation and Safety
- Website: www.dmirs.wa.gov.au

Production
- Commodity: Iron ore
- Production: ▲861.3 million tonnes
- Value: ▼ A$125.1 billion
- Employees: ▲61,203 (FTE)^{[1]}
- Year: 2022–23

Iron ore mining in Western Australia, in the 2018–19 financial year, accounted for 54 percent of the total value of the state's resource production, with a value of A$78.2 billion. The overall value of the minerals and petroleum industry in Western Australia was A$145 billion in 2018–19, a 26 percent increase on the previous financial year.

Western Australia's iron ore output for 2020–21 was 838.7 million tonnes, the second-highest figure after 2017–18. The bulk of Western Australian ore went to China, which imported 82% of 2021 production, followed by Japan and South Korea, with 6% each. The state has the world's largest reserves of iron ore with 29% of the world's iron ore, followed by Brazil with 19%, Russia with 15% and China with 12%.

In 2020–21 the Western Australian Government received A$9.8 billion in royalties from the iron ore mining industry in the state. The remaining life of the Pilbara iron ore fields has been estimated as 65 years from 2021.

== History ==
Australian Iron and Steel had leases for the iron ore deposit on Cockatoo Island, in Yampi Sound, and later secured leases over deposits on the neighbouring Koolan Island. The company bought a schooner, Geraldton, carried out survey work on Cockatoo Island in 1929 and 1930, and built some accommodation buildings and a reservoir on the island in 1932. The housing was deserted by May 1934. Cecil Hoskins tried to obtain financial support from Japanese mining interests to develop the Yampi Sound ore deposits—some of the ore was to be exported to Japan—but discussions apparently broke down in early 1935. After the end of the Second World War, the company, now a BHP subsidiary, began developing the deposit on Cockatoo Island, and its first ore shipment was in 1951.

Iron ore mining also took place at Wundowie and later at Koolyanobbing, to feed the Wundowie charcoal iron blast furnaces, from 1948 to 1981. Koolyanobbing also supplied ore to a BHP owned blast furnace at Kwinana, from 1968 to 1982. Since that time, apart from a short-lived direct reduced iron plant, at Port Hedland, no iron has been smelted in Western Australia, and almost all ore mined has been exported.

While the Pilbara iron ore deposits were known, such as the Mount Whaleback deposit discovered in 1957 by Stan Hilditch, it was not until 1960, when the Australian government lifted the embargo on iron ore exports that it had put in place because of concerns the mineral was in short supply, that mining began in earnest. Up until the mid-1960s, iron ore production in Western Australia, and Australia as a whole, was negligible, in the range of less than 10 million tons a year. By the mid-1970s, this figure had reached 100 million tonnes, with the majority coming from Western Australia. Production slightly declined in the 1980s, but it improved in the 1990s, reaching 150 million tonnes for the country by 1997 and 200 million tonnes by 2003.

The first mine in the Pilbara, the Goldsworthy mine, was developed in 1965 by Mount Goldsworthy Mining Associates, a joint venture between the British-owned Consolidated Goldfields (Aust) Pty Ltd, Cyprus Mines Corporation of Los Angeles, and Utah Construction & Mining Company of San Francisco. A private railway line, the Goldsworthy railway, as well as port facilities at Finucane Island, Port Hedland, were also constructed. On 1 June 1966, the first shipment of iron ore from the Pilbara left on board Harvey S. Mudd.

BHP's operations in Newman date back to 1968, when the Mount Whaleback mine was opened, the biggest single open-pit iron ore mine in the world. A new town, Mount Newman, was constructed, as well as a 426 kilometre railway line, the Mount Newman railway. The first train left Mount Newman on 1 January 1969 and the first shipment of Newman ore left port on 1 April 1969 on board of Osumi Maru. Newman remained a "closed" company town until 1981.

Rio Tinto's iron ore operations in the Pilbara began in 1966, with the Mount Tom Price mine opened that year, becoming the company's first mine to open in the Pilbara.

== Overview ==
=== Exploration ===
Quarterly expenditure ($millions) on iron ore exploration in Western Australia since 1988

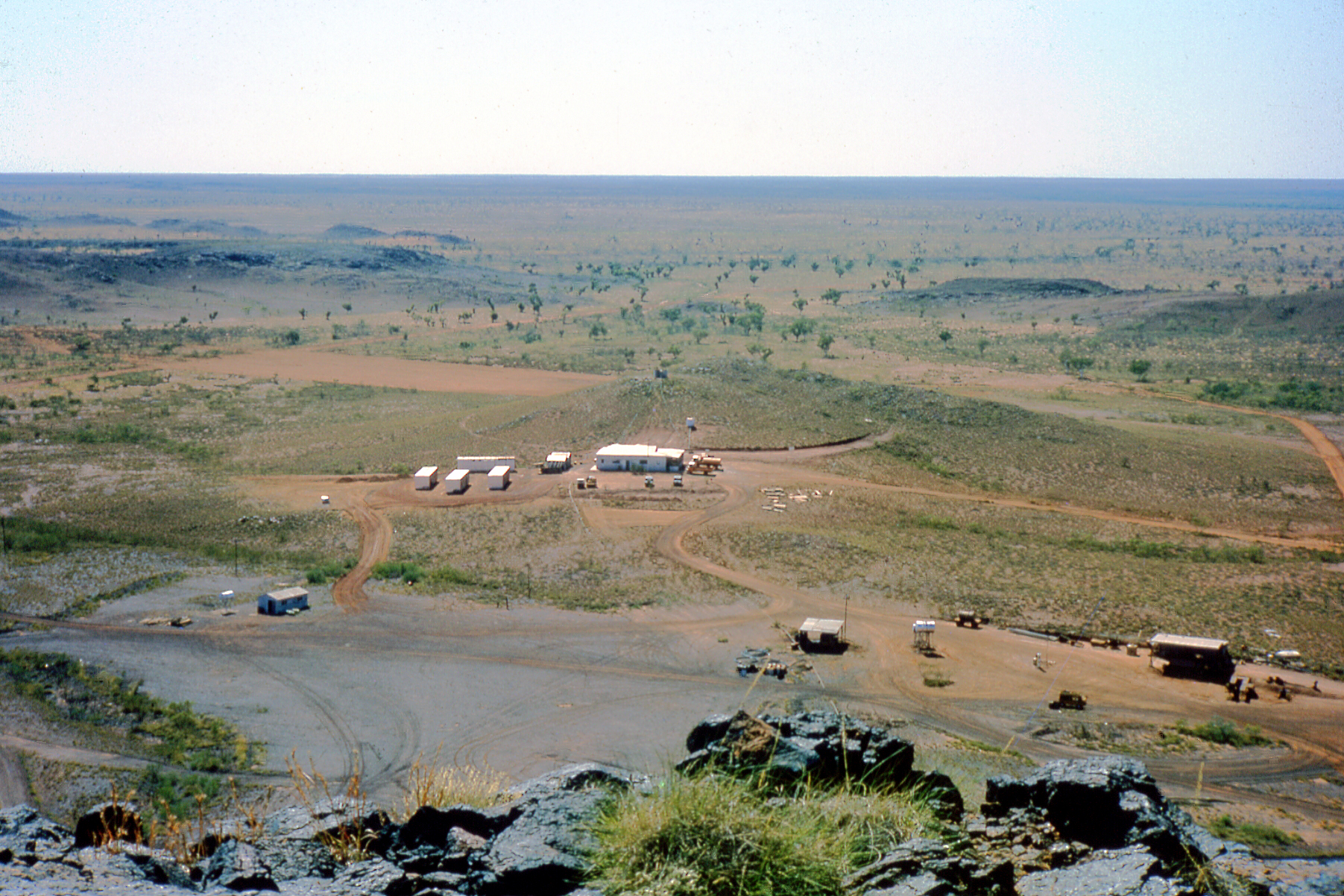
Early exploration camp at Mount Goldsworthy (1964)

In 2008–09, expenditure for exploration in iron ore in Western Australia increased by 33 percent compared to the previous financial year, 2007–08. The A$560 million spend on iron ore exploration accounted for 45 percent of all mineral exploration expenditure in the state.

=== Production ===
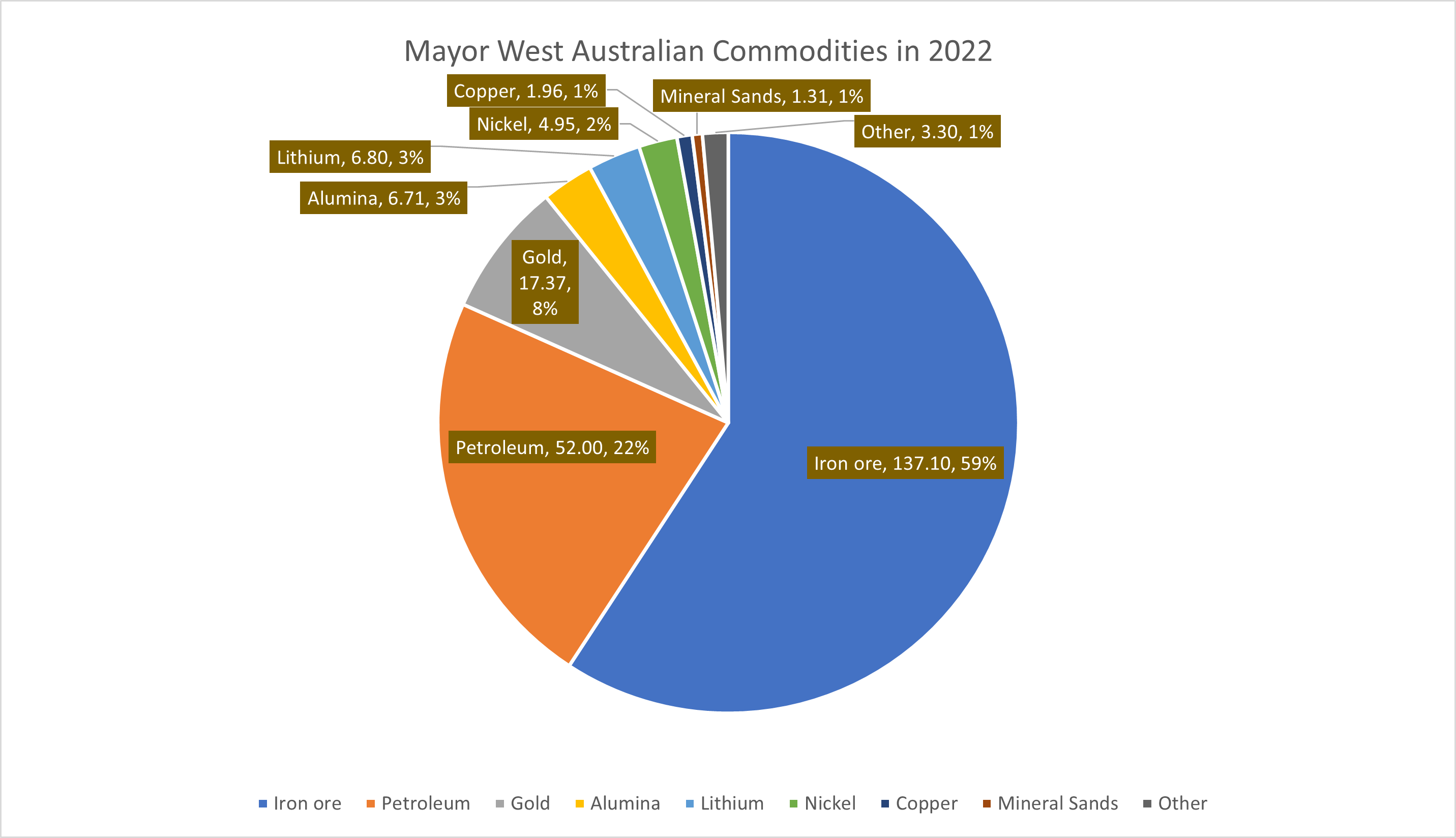
Major Western Australian commodities in 2022

The bulk of iron ore production in Western Australia comes from the Pilbara region of the state. A number of mines however are also located in the Mid West and Kimberley regions as well as in the Wheatbelt.

The big two producers, Rio Tinto and BHP, accounted for 90 percent of all iron ore production in the state in 2008–09, with the third-biggest producer being the Fortescue Metals Group.

Rio Tinto operates twelve iron ore mines in Western Australia, BHP seven, Fortescue two; all of those are located in the Pilbara region.

=== Railways ===
==== Pilbara region ====
Iron ore mines in the Pilbara region.

The three largest iron ore producers operate private rail networks to transport ore from their mines to ports on the coast.

BHP operates the Goldsworthy railway and the Mount Newman railway, both terminating at Port Hedland.

Rio Tinto operates the Hamersley & Robe River railway, formed in a 2001 merger of the Hamersley and Robe River railways. The two lines terminate at Cape Lambert and Dampier.

FMG's Fortescue railway, a relative newcomer, started operation in 2008. The line terminates at Port Hedland. Before deciding to construct its own line, FMG applied to the National Competition Council, on 15 June 2004, to use part of the Mount Newman railway and also part of the Goldsworthy railway.

In June 2010, the Australian Competition Tribunal ruled that FMG would be granted access to Rio Tinto's Robe River line and BHP Billiton's Goldsworthy line but not to the busier Hamersley and Mount Newman lines. Treasurer Wayne Swan suggested that several advantages would accrue from access to the rail lines by third parties. It would increase competition, reduce duplication of infrastructure, and reduce environmental damage. Atlas Iron, another junior iron ore miner, is hopeful to come to terms with BHP Billiton in regards to using some of the company's rail infrastructure, the Goldsworthy railway, in the future. BHP, in late 2010, had agreed to a joint feasibility study into how an arrangement might work.

Access to the rail networks by third parties is governed by the State Agreements Act.

==== Westrail region ====
Other mines connect to port using the state government-owned railways. Examples are Windarling Range and Koolyanobbing – from Koolyanobbing to the port of Esperance; Karara mine using the Karara railway to link to the state network at Morawa; Koolanooka using a 60 km spur line linking to the state network at Morawa; and Mt Gibson trucking to an ore loading siding at Perenjori.

=== Ports ===
In the Pilbara, iron ore is shipped from Port Hedland, Dampier and Cape Lambert. The latter two ports are exclusively used by Rio Tinto, while Port Hedland is used by BHP, FMG and Atlas Iron.

Port facilities at Port Hedland consist of Nelson Point and Finucane Island, both BHP, and Herb Elliott Port, used by FMG. In Dampier, ore is shipped from Parker Point and East Intercourse Island.

The non-Pilbara mines ship their ore out of other ports: Windarling Range ships from the port of Esperance; the Jack Hills, Koolanooka, Mungada and Mt Gibson mines ship from Geraldton.

=== Projects ===
Major iron ore mining locations in Western Australia with Perth as a reference

BHP is currently spending A$1.85 billion on its Rapid Growth Project 4, aimed at increasing its annual iron ore output to 155 million tonnes. To achieve this, upgrades to both mines and port facilities are necessary. The project is scheduled for completion by 2010. As a follow-up, Rapid Growth Project 5, with a budget of A$4.8 billion, targets a further production increase of 50 million tonnes annually. Additionally to upgrades at the mines and ports, it will also include duplication of existing railway lines and is scheduled for completion in late 2011. The Jimblebar mine is part of another expansion project, launched in 2010 and aimed at increasing production from the Pilbara mines to 240 million tonnes of iron ore annually by 2013. The expansion of Jimlebar, together with an expansion of the inner harbour at Port Hedland and works on the duplication of rail tracks is estimated to cost A$2.15billion. The project is titled Rapid Growth Project 6.

Rio Tinto declared its intent to expand the Hope Downs mine, spending a further A$1.78 billion on its new Hope Downs 4 project, scheduled to produce 15 million tonnes of iron ore annually by 2013. Rio has commenced construction on its new Western Turner Syncline project. Rio Tinto allocated a further A$1.24 billion in early December 2010, to expand the Brockman 4 mine to 40 million tonnes per annum, from 22, as well as develop its Western Turner Syncline project, raising planned production there from 6 to 15 million tonnes, with the aim of increasing the Pilbara production to 283 million tonnes per annum by late 2013. The expansion would make Brockman 4 Rio Tinto's second-largest mine in the Pilbara. The company has also begun further construction at the port at Cape Lambert, which is scheduled to undergo a further expansion, to be completed by 2012. The new expansion is scheduled to cost A$276 million. The expansion is part of a plan to raise Rio's annual production from the Pilbara from 220 to 330 million tonnes annually by 2016. To achieve this, the Cape Lambert port capacity will be expanded to handle an additional 100 million tonnes annually.

Plans by the Fortescue Metals Group to increase production from 39 million tonnes to 55 million tonnes through a US$220 million upgrade of the Cloud Break mine had to be abandoned in October 2009 because of funding difficulties through its Chinese investors. Instead, Fortescue decided to develop its Christmas Creek mine, at a cost of US$360 million, by building a mine and process plant there and linking it to its existing rail network. Christmas Creek is scheduled to produce 16 million tonnes of iron ore in its first year of operation. Fortescue plans to reach an annual production of 95 million tonnes of iron ore by 2012, downgraded from an earlier target of 120 million.

At Cape Preston, CITIC Pacific Mining is currently, as of 2010, in the process of constructing a 27.6 million tonnes per annum magnetite iron ore mine, named the Sino Iron Project.

=== Export ===
China, in 2008–09, was the main importer of Western Australian iron ore, having taken 64 percent, or A$21 billion in value. Japan was the second-most important market with 21 percent, followed by South Korea with 10 percent and Taiwan with 3. In comparison, Europe is a small market for ore from the state, having taken only one percent of the overall production in 2008–09. By 2025–26, the China share of Western Australia's iron ore exports have increased to 86 percent, with South Korea and Japan both taking around 5 percent.

== Criticism ==
The iron ore mining boom in Western Australia experienced since the early 2000s has not exclusively been seen as positive. Communities in the Pilbara region have seen a large influx of residential and fly-in fly-out workers, which has seen land prices increase significantly and has negatively affected tourism as accommodation has become sparse.

=== Aboriginal communities ===
Australian Aboriginal culture in the region is deeply connected to the land and water, and the mining activities threaten the fragile desert environment of the Pilbara. Locals in the Pilbara argue that the wealth generated by the local mining industry is passing them by and they are left behind. A lack of accommodation and the unattractive nature of relocating to the "dusty outback" resulted in a majority work force of fly-in fly-out workers, depriving local towns of the benefits of a high-earning permanent population.

Mining companies in Australia have, since 1992, changed their attitude towards the local Aboriginal population. In 1992, the Australian government began to recognise the land rights of the Indigenous Australians, opening an opportunity for the latter to engage in negotiations with mining companies to press for compensation and for assistance in preserving cultural artifacts. However, some Aboriginals feel short-changed, given the enormous profits made from mining, and also consider the financial benefits and employment opportunities as insufficient compensation for the destruction caused to their habitat.

Aboriginal mining companies have been able to secure contracts with the big international mining companies. In 2007, BHP Billiton awarded a A$300 million contract to Ngarda Civil and Mining, an Aboriginal-owned company, to manage the Yarrie mine, the largest ever mining contract awarded to an Aboriginal company. As part of the five-year contract, BHP Billiton planned to increase the number of Aboriginal workers at the mine to 70, out of a total of 90 workers. The managing director of Ngarda, Brian Taylor, saw this contract as a positive step, moving Aboriginal people in the region away from government welfare and into permanent employment. Aboriginal Western Australians, in 2007, suffered from an unemployment rate of 14 percent in the state, compared to 3.3% for the general population. Of the 12,000 people employed by BHP Billiton in its Pilbara operations in 2010, 700 were Indigenous. Rio Tinto also, as of 2010, employs 700 indigenous workers in its Pilbara operations, comprising 6 percent of its overall work force. FMG, under the leadership of Andrew Forrest, is driving a national program which aims to find 50,000 jobs for Indigenous workers in Australia. Companies like BHP, FMG and Rio Tinto have programs aimed at increasing the number of Aboriginal employees in their operations. Indigenous Australians in Western Australia in 2001 accounted for 3.1% of the population.

Companies however lack an understanding of Aboriginal culture, which requires young men to be sent to the bush for up to six weeks to hunt and learn about their culture. Companies are often unwilling to award their Indigenous employees this time off to be able to perform these important traditions.

== Safety ==
Since the late 1960s, when the Department of Mines began categorising fatalities by commodity, until 2010, 86 work-related fatalities have occurred in the iron ore mining industry in Western Australia.

== List of active mines ==
This is a list of major active iron ore mines in Western Australia in 2022–23, according to the Department of Mines, Industry Regulation and Safety. To qualify for the department's official list of principal mining projects an operation has to either have mineral sales valued at more than $5 million, or, for operations where such figures are not reported, have a minimum of 50 employees:

Mine	Owner ^{1}	Shire	Capacity ^{2}	Opening year	Coordinates ^{3}
Miralga Creek mine	Atlas Iron	Shire of East Pilbara	2	2022	21°00′17″S 119°19′04″E
Mt Webber mine	Atlas Iron	Shire of East Pilbara	9	2014	21°32′13″S 119°17′20″E
Sanjiv Ridge mine	Atlas Iron	Shire of East Pilbara	4	2021	21°24′14″S 119°41′35″E
Area C mine	BHP	Shire of East Pilbara	55	2003	22°55′12″S 118°58′28″E
Jimblebar mine	BHP	Shire of East Pilbara	14	1989	23°23′04″S 120°07′23″E
Newman West	BHP	Shire of East Pilbara	38	1968	23°21′55″S 119°40′31″E
Newman East	BHP	Shire of East Pilbara	12		23°20′23″S 119°47′59″E
South Flank mine	BHP	Shire of East Pilbara	80	2021	22°59′27″S 118°52′43″E
Yandi mine	BHP	Shire of East Pilbara	41	1992	22°44′01″S 119°07′06″E
Iron Ridge mine	Fenix Resources	Shire of Cue	1.25	2021	26°57′14″S 117°40′45″E
Christmas Creek mine	FMG	Shire of East Pilbara	16	2009	22°22′46″S 119°50′59″E
Cloud Break mine	FMG	Shire of Ashburton	28	2008	22°19′26″S 119°23′49″E
Eliwana mine	FMG	Shire of Ashburton	30	2020	22°28′16″S 116°49′40″E
Firetail mine	FMG	Shire of Ashburton	27	2013	22°12′54″S 117°53′41″E
Kings Valley mine	FMG	Shire of Ashburton	40	2014	22°07′14″S 117°52′38″E
Queens Valley mine	FMG	Shire of Ashburton		2022	22°08′26″S 117°49′06″E
Roy Hill mine	Hancock Prospecting	Shire of East Pilbara	60	2015	22°37′19″S 119°57′30″E
Karara mine	Karara Mining Limited	Shire of Perenjori	8	2010	29°11′28″S 116°45′38″E
Iron Valley mine	BCI Minerals (operated by Mineral Resources)	Shire of East Pilbara	8	2014	22°43′36″S 119°19′28″E
Koolyanobbing mine	Mineral Resources	Shire of Yilgarn	8	2018	30°49′02″S 119°31′12″E
Wonmunna mine	Mineral Resources	Shire of East Pilbara	5	2021	23°07′48″S 119°02′34″E
Koolan Island mine	Mount Gibson Iron	Shire of Derby–West Kimberley	0.4	2007	16°07′31″S 123°44′18″E
Brockman 2 mine	Rio Tinto	Shire of Ashburton	8.7	1992	22°25′38″S 117°20′29″E
Brockman 4 mine	Rio Tinto	Shire of Ashburton	22	2010	22°34′31″S 117°16′07″E
Channar mine	Rio Tinto (60%), Sinosteel (40%)	Shire of Ashburton	20	1990	23°18′48″S 117°47′06″E
Eastern Range mine	Rio Tinto	Shire of Ashburton	20	2004	23°18′48″S 117°47′06″E
Gudai-Darri mine	Rio Tinto	Shire of East Pilbara	43	2022	22°30′20″S 119°01′39″E
Hope Downs mine	Rio Tinto	Shire of East Pilbara	30	2007	23°08′42″S 119°34′19″E
Hope Downs 4 mine	Rio Tinto	Shire of East Pilbara	15	2014	23°08′50″S 119°32′45″E
Marandoo mine	Rio Tinto	Shire of Ashburton	15	1994	22°38′25″S 118°07′15″E
Mesa A mine	Rio Tinto	Shire of Ashburton	25	2010	21°40′12″S 115°54′14″E
Mesa J mine	Rio Tinto	Shire of Ashburton	7	1994	21°45′00″S 116°14′32″E
Mount Tom Price mine	Rio Tinto	Shire of Ashburton	28	1966	22°44′58″S 117°46′22″E
Nammuldi mine	Rio Tinto	Shire of Ashburton	6.6	2006	22°25′07″S 117°21′37″E
Paraburdoo mine	Rio Tinto	Shire of Ashburton	20	1972	23°13′36″S 117°36′30″E
Silvergrass mine	Rio Tinto	Shire of Ashburton	10	2017	22°19′19″S 117°18′08″E
West Angelas mine	Rio Tinto	Shire of East Pilbara	29.5	2002	23°10′23″S 118°45′53″E
Western Turner mine	Rio Tinto	Shire of Ashburton		2021	22°40′09″S 117°35′32″E
Yandicoogina mine	Rio Tinto	Shire of East Pilbara	52	1998	22°46′09″S 119°13′49″E
Blue Hills mine	Sinosteel Midwest Corporation	Shire of Perenjori	1	2021	29°08′27″S 116°52′14″E

- ^{1} Majority-owner and operator shown only
- ^{2} Capacity is the production capacity of the mine, not actual annual production, and is in million tonnes of iron ore per annum
- ^{3} Coordinates of the main processing facility

== List of inactive and exhausted mines ==
This is a list of former iron ore mines in Western Australia:

Mine	Owner	Location	Region	Opening year	Closing year
Cockatoo Island mine	Pluton Resources	Cockatoo Island	Kimberley	1995 (1951-1986)	2015
Goldsworthy mine	Mount Goldsworthy Mining Associates	Goldsworthy	Pilbara	1966	1982
Jack Hills mine	Mitsubishi Corporation	Jack Hills	Mid West	2006	2012
Koolanooka mine	Sinosteel Midwest	Morawa	Mid West	2010 (1965-1974)	2013
Nimingarra mine	BHP Biliton	Goldsworthy	Pilbara	1988	2007
Shay Gap mine	Mount Goldsworthy Mining Associates	Shay Gap	Pilbara	1973	1993
Tallering Peak	Mount Gibson Iron	Mullewa	Mid West	2004	2014
Wundowie mine	Charcoal Iron & Steel Industry (WA Government)	Wundowie	Wheatbelt	1948	1951
Yarrie mine	BHP	Yarrie	Pilbara	1993	2014

== Statistics ==
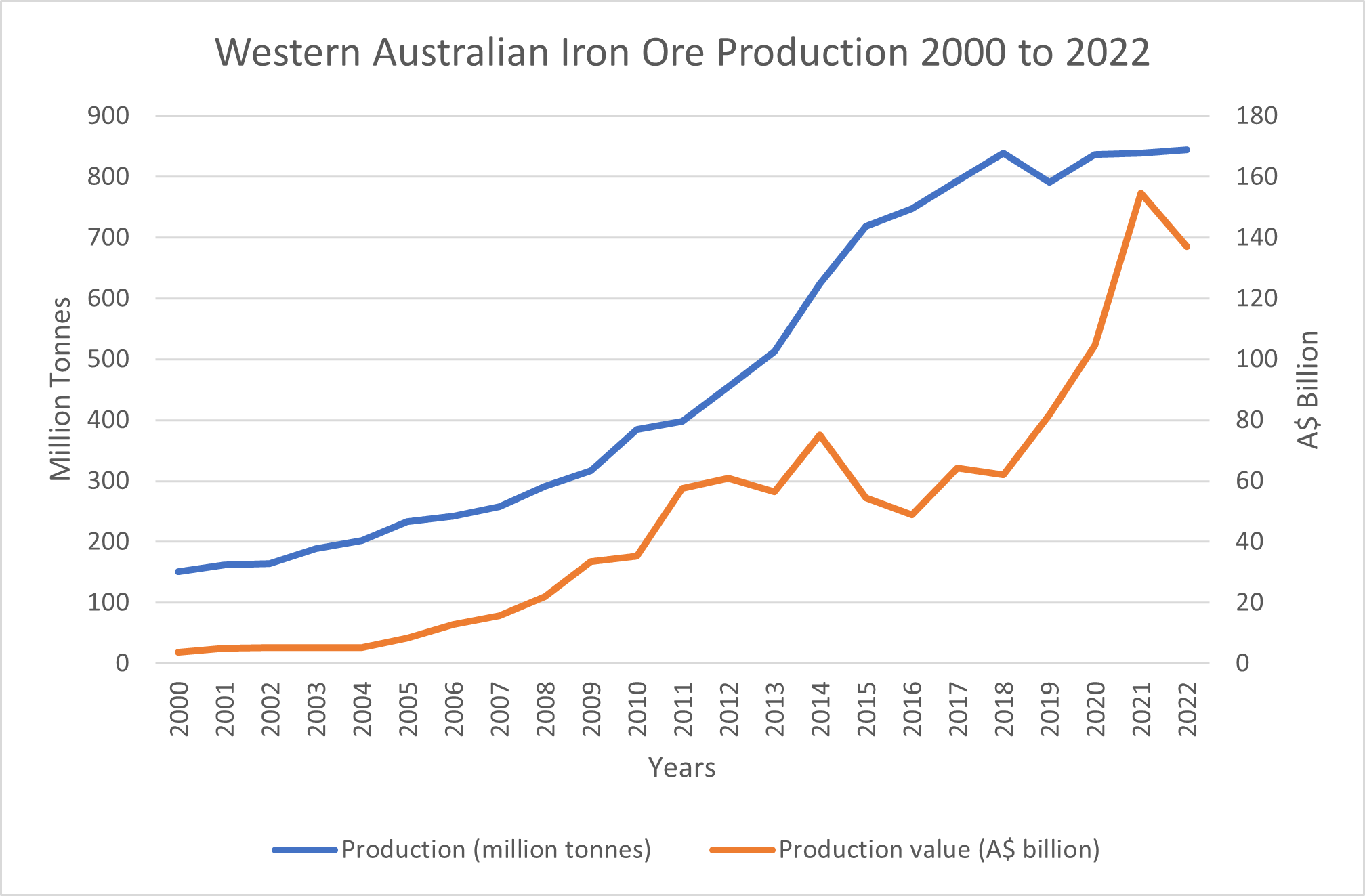
Western Australian iron ore production and value from 2000 to 2022

Annual statistics for the Western Australian iron ore mining industry:

Subject	1990	1991	1992	1993	1994	1995	1996	1997	1998	1999
Production (million tonnes/annum)	106.27	107.67	111.64	111.73	119.69	133.13	132.90	141.29	149.74	141.02
Production value (A$ billion)	2.25	2.65	2.95	2.99	2.87	2.79	2.92	3.16	3.93	3.97

Subject	2000	2001	2002	2003	2004	2005	2006	2007	2008	2009
Production (million tonnes/annum)	151.2	161.8	164.6	188.2	202.0	233.2	242.6	257.6	291.0	316.5
Production value (A$ billion)	3.72	4.91	5.21	5.19	5.33	8.30	12.7	15.7	22.0	33.6
WA Royalty Receipts (A$ million)	285	272	290	330	534	774	830	1,518	1,701	2,394
Employees	9,103	9,289	11,184	12,585	13,727	16,203	18,387	23,185	26,051	27,537

Subject	2010	2011	2012	2013	2014	2015	2016	2017	2018	2019
Production (million tonnes/annum)	385.0	397.6	454.4	512.6	623.5	718.8	748.1	793.0	839.4	790.6
Production value (A$ billion)	35.3	57.6	60.8	56.4	75.2	54.4	48.8	64.3	62.1	81.8
WA Royalty Receipts (A$ million)	3,785	3,535	4,344	5,226	5,448	4,026	3,600	4,708	4,476	4,884
Employees	33,345	43,008	55,323	60,844	58,257	58,093	53,229	53,221	53,716	59,525

Subject	2020	2021	2022	2023
Production (million tonnes/annum)	836.8	838.7	844.4	861.3
Production value (A$ billion)	104.6	154.7	137.1	125.1
WA Royalty Receipts (A$ million)	7,802	9,797	10,848	9,400
Employees (Full time)	52,321	60,488	59,724	61,203
Employees (all personnel on site)	65,454	76,150	78,974	^{[1]}

== Notes ==
- ^[1] Full time employees only. Up until 2022, the Western Australian Mineral and Petroleum Statistics Digest listed a combined figure of both full time employees and on-site personnel but the latter was not included in the 2022–23 edition, which only listed full time employees.
