= Mt Webber mine =

Mine in Western Australia

- Location in Western Australia
- Interactive map of Mt Webber mine
- Location: Shire of East Pilbara, Western Australia, Australia; 21°32′13″S 119°17′20″E
- Products: Iron ore
- Production: 9 million tonnes (20 billion pounds) per annum
- Opened: 2014
- Company: Atlas Iron
- Website: https://www.atlasiron.com.au/

The Mt Webber mine is an iron ore mine operated by Atlas Iron and located in the Pilbara region of Western Australia, 230 kilometres (140 mi) from Port Hedland, to where the ore is transported. Mt Webber, opened in 2014, is the company's primary operation.

== Overview ==
Iron ore mines in the Pilbara region

The mine officially opened in July 2014 and was, at the time, the company’s fifth operation, initially contributing 1 million tonnes (2.2 billion pounds) of iron ore per annum to the company's production. At the time of opening, the iron ore price was at a two year low but, at the same time, labour costs had also been lower, allowing for reduced construction costs. A joint venture of Atlas Iron Limited and Altura Mining Limited at the time, construction cost of Mt Webber was A$210 million.

Less than a year after opening Mt Webber, Atlas Iron suspended all operations because of declining iron ore prices. The mine reopened two month later, in July 2015, after Atlas had reached a A$12 million mining royalties relief deal with the Government of Western Australia and reduced its production cost to below A$50, at an iron ore market price of A$61.50 at the time. Expected production figures at the time were 6 million tonnes (13 billion pounds) per annum for the next eight years.

Atlas Iron was acquired by Redstone Resources, a fully owned subsidiary of Hancock Prospecting in October 2018.

Having exhausted the Pardoo, Wodgina, Abydos and Mt Dove mines by 2021, Atlas was operating just two mines at this point, Mt Webber and Sanjiv Ridge (formerly Corunna Downs). A third mine, Miralga Creek, commenced operations in late February 2022.
