= Sanjiv Ridge mine =

Mine in Western Australia

- Location in Western Australia
- Interactive map of Sanjiv Ridge mine
- Location: Shire of East Pilbara, Western Australia, Australia; 21°24′14″S 119°41′35″E
- Products: Iron ore
- Production: 4 million tonnes (8.8 billion pounds) to 5 million tonnes (11 billion pounds) per annum
- Opened: 2021
- Company: Atlas Iron
- Website: https://www.atlasiron.com.au/

The Sanjiv Ridge mine, formerly the Corunna Downs mine is an iron ore mine operated by Atlas Iron and located in the Pilbara region of Western Australia, 33 kilometres (21 mi) south of Marble Bar and 240 kilometres (150 mi) from Port Hedland. Ore from the mine is transported overland via road train to the Utah Point Bulk Commodities Berth at Port Hedland.

== Overview ==
Iron ore mines in the Pilbara region

Approval to construct an iron ore process plant at Corunna Downs was received in September 2017. The mine was proposed to consist of five open pits, with an anticipated 23.1 million tonnes (51 billion pounds) of iron ore to be mined at the location over a six year period. The crushed ore would then be transported by road train with a payload up to 150 tonnes (330 thousand pounds) to the Utah Point Bulk Commodities Berth at Port Hedland.

The Corunna Downs was temporarily suspended by Atlas in 2017 because of low iron ore prices, having initially intended to spend A$53 million to develop the project.

Haulage of iron ore from Sanjiv Ridge commenced in late February 2021, having crushed its first ore at the mine earlier that month. Having exhausted the Pardoo, Wodgina, Abydos and Mt Dove mines at this point, Atlas was operating just two mines, Sanjiv Ridge and Mt Webber. A third mine, Miralga Creek, commenced operations a year later, in late February 2022.

The Sanjiv Ridge mine was renamed in 2021 after the company's CEO, Sanjiv Manchanda, from its original name, Corunna Downs mine. The mine is located approximately 10 kilometres (6.2 mi) west of the historic Corunna Downs Station and World War II Corunna Downs Airfield.
