= Wodgina Airport =

Airport in Western Australia

- IATA: GYB; ICAO: YWGA

Summary
- Airport type: Private
- Elevation AMSL: 410 ft / 125 m
- Coordinates: 21°02′09″S 118°38′37″E

Map
- Location of the airport in Western Australia

Runways
Direction	Length		Surface
Direction	ft	m	Surface
09/27	6,890	2,100	Asphalt

Wodgina Airport (IATA: GYB, ICAO: YWGA) is an airport serving the Pilbara region of Western Australia. It services the nearby Wodgina mine.

== Airlines and destinations ==
Airlines	Destinations
MinRes Air	Charter: Kens Bore, Perth
QantasLink	Charter: Perth
Skytrans Australia	Charter: Brisbane, Kens Bore

== See also ==
- List of airports in Western Australia
- Aviation transport in Australia
