= Kens Bore Airport =

Airport in Western Australia

- IATA: KYB; ICAO: YKBA

Summary
- Airport type: Private
- Elevation AMSL: 709 ft (216 m)
- Coordinates: 22°09′25″S 116°09′22″E

Map
- Location of the airport in Western Australia

Runways
Direction	Length		Surface
Direction	ft	m	Surface
14/32	6,890	2,100

Kens Bore Airport (IATA: KYB, ICAO: YKBA) is an airport serving the Pilbara region of Western Australia.

== Airlines and destinations ==
Airlines	Destinations
MinRes Air	Charter: Perth, Wodgina
Skytrans Australia	Charter: Brisbane, Wodgina

== See also ==
- List of airports in Western Australia
- Aviation transport in Australia
