= Spinifex =

Spinifex may refer to:

- Spinifex (coastal grass), a genus of grasses growing on coastal dunes in Asia and Australasia
- Triodia (plant), a genus of grasses of inland Australia, commonly known as spinifexes
- Spinifex, a texture in certain ultramafic lavas such as komatiite

== See also ==
- Spinifex people, an Aboriginal Australian people, inhabitants of the Spinifex country
- Spinifex Arts Project, an art centre in Tjuntjuntjara community, Western Australia
- Spinifex Gum, an Australian musical group
- Spinifex hopping mouse, a mouse native to the central and western Australian arid zones
- Spinifex pigeon (Geophaps plumifera), a bird found in Australia
- Spinifex Press, Australian book publisher
- Spinifex resin, a type of gum
- Spinifex Ridge mine, a mine in Australia
- Spinifexbird (Eremiornis carteri), a bird found in Australia
