= PLS (company) =

Australian lithium mining company

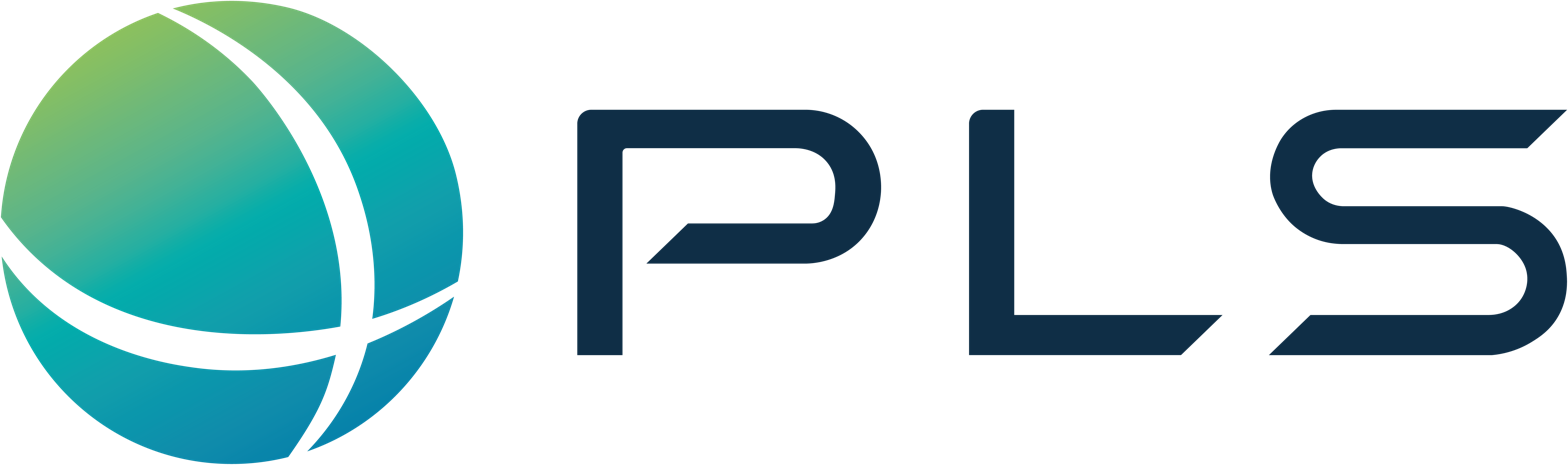
- Formerly: Formerly Pilbara Minerals
- Company type: Public
- Traded as: ASX: PLS
- Industry: Mining
- Founded: 2013
- Founder: Neil Biddle; John Young; George Karageorge; Stuart Till; John Holmes
- Headquarters: West Perth, Western Australia
- Key people: Kathleen Conlon (Chairman); Dale Henderson (CEO)
- Products: Lithium, Tantalite
- Revenue: $1.3 billion (2024)
- Operating income: $397.7 million (2024)
- Net income: $256.88 million (2024)
- Website: https://pls.com/

Pilbara Minerals Limited (PLS) is a Perth-based ASX listed company, owning one of the world’s largest, independent hard rock lithium operation. Located in Western Australia’s Pilbara region, PLS’ Pilgangoora Operation produces spodumene and tantalite concentrates.

== Pilgangoora operation ==
PLS’ Pilgangoora Operation is located 140km from Port Hedland in Western Australia’s Pilbara region. The Pilgangoora ore body is one of the largest hard rock lithium deposits in the world.

While the Pilgangoora Operation delivers spodumene concentrate to market, PLS is pursuing a growth and diversification strategy to become a sustainable, low cost lithium producer and a fully integrated battery materials supplier in the future. A 13 MW / 8 MWh battery was installed in 2025 to supplement the 6 MW solar and 30 MW gas power generation.

== Colina project ==
PLS' Colina Project is located 10 kilometres from the town of Salinas in the mining jurisdiction of Minas Gerais, Brazil. PLS acquired the Colina Project in 2025 following the acquisition of Latin Resources.

The project has the potential to become a hard rock lithium operation by production globally (excluding Africa) with a current combined Mineral Resource inventory of more than 77.7 million tonnes with ongoing exploration and drilling planned to unlock the project’s full potential of the resource.

== Downstream lithium chemical facility ==
PLS has an 18% equity stake in a joint venture with South Korean company POSCO known as POSCO Pilbara Lithium Solutions (PPLS). In 2024, PPLS completed construction of a Lithium Hydroxide Chemical Facility in Gwangyang, South Korea.

PLS will supply spodumene concentrate to the facility from its Pilgangoora Operation in Western Australia under a long term offtake agreement.

The facility has the potential to produce up to 43,000 tonnes of lithium hydroxide per year at full capacity, enough to make batteries for around one million electric vehicles.

== History ==
PLS was founded in 2013 by a group of five geologists who studied at university together. PLS’ history is fairly new and a short one in terms of Australian mining, and the Company is one of the first in Australian lithium sector and a major contributor to the global lithium supply chain.

From the first drill hole to production in less than four years, PLS’ Pilgangoora Operation has developed to become a major global supplier producing 11%^{1} of the world’s hard rock lithium.

^{1} Based on hard rock lithium supply in calendar year 2024 as estimated by Benchmark Mineral Intelligence in the Lithium Forecast Report Q2 2024.
