= Bendu case =

The Bendhu case, also called the Bendhu atrocity, took place at Bendhu cattle station in the Pilbara region of Western Australia in 1897. The station owner and his brother were prosecuted for flogging to death three Aboriginal workers who had fled the station.

== The incident ==
In September 1897 six Aboriginal workers ran away from Bendhu station, apparently because sheep had run away and they were afraid of being punished. Having walked for over 25 miles without water, they were recaptured by Ernest and Alexander Anderson, who proceeded to severely flog them.

One elderly man (Pringamurra, also called Spider) and two women (Warradamngenmia, also called Biddy; and Narilung, also called Polly) died later that day. Another man (Jabramurra, also called Kandy) and two girls (Haberine, also called Louie, aged about twelve; and Wireroo, also called Minnie, aged about eight) were also flogged and left for dead, but survived.

A post-mortem examination concluded that Pringamurra, Warradamngenmia and Narilung had died of shock from injuries sustained from the flogging (which included broken bones), possibly exacerbated by dehydration and exhaustion.

== Prosecution and aftermath ==
Ernest and Alexander Anderson were initially fined £2 and issued with a warning about their behaviour. After public outrage, the police upgraded the charge against them to one of murder. Alexander Anderson died of typhoid fever in Fremantle Prison whilst awaiting trial.

Ernest Anderson was tried for murder but found guilty on the lesser charge of manslaughter. The Chief Justice, Alexander Onslow, was dismayed at the jury's verdict, and considered Anderson to be guilty of a "particularly hideous and atrocious murder". He sentenced Anderson to life imprisonment, a uniquely severe sentence for a manslaughter case at this time. Anderson was thought to be the first white man to be convicted of manslaughter and sentenced to life imprisonment for the murder of an Aboriginal person under Western Australia's legal system of self-government. He was ultimately released from prison after serving only six years of his sentence.

The case was reported widely in the Australian press (and in some British newspapers), many of which condemned the verdict of manslaughter as excessively lenient.
