= Mineral Resources =

Mining company in Western Australia

- Traded as: ASX: MIN
- Industry: Mining
- Founded: July 2006
- Founder: Chris Ellison
- Headquarters: Perth, Western Australia
- Area served: Goldfields, Pilbara
- Key people: James McClements (Chairman); Chris Ellison (Managing Director)
- Products: Iron ore, lithium
- Services: Mining services
- Revenue: $5.3 billion (2024)
- Net income: $158 million (2024)
- Number of employees: 8,500 (2024)
- Website: www.mineralresources.com.au

Mineral Resources Limited, commonly known as MinRes, is a Western Australian mining services company.

== History ==
Mineral Resources was established in July 2006 when pipeline manufacturing and contracting business PIHA, Crushing Services International and Process Minerals International merged and was listed on the Australian Securities Exchange.

In November 2023 the Bald Hill Lithium and Tantalum Mine was purchased. In November 2024 the mine was closed and put into care and maintenance after a collapse in lithium prices.

In June 2024, Mineral Resources announced it would shut down its Yilgarn iron ore hub by the end of the year after it was deemed financially unviable.

== Operations ==
Mineral Resources operates two iron ore hubs: Utah Point Hub in Port Hedland and Yilgarn Hub in Esperance. Mines are operated at Iron Valley, Koolyanobbing and Kumina.

Mineral Resources is involved in bulk ore transportation in the Pilbara. In 2014, Mineral Resources purchased six UGL Rail C44aci locomotives and 382 iron ore wagons with Pacific National taking over the operation of its services from Aurizon. In November 2023 the services were taken over by Aurizon with the six locomoives sold to Southern Shorthaul Railroad.

Minerals Resources operates two hard rock lithium mines in Western Australia;
Mount Marion in the Goldfields, and Wodgina in the Pilbara. Mount Marion contains the world's second-biggest high-grade lithium mineral resources, with an estimated 71 million tonnes (160 billion pounds) of the mineral spodumene.

== MinRes Air ==
Having previously relied on other air service providers to operate flights for its fly-in fly-out workforce, in July 2024 MinRes Air was launched with a former Tigerair Airbus A319 on services between Brisbane and the Pilbara with plans to introduce a Perth service. Mineral Resources has a 50% shareholding with the balance owned by Multiplex heir Tim Roberts.

Initially the services were operated by Skytraders, until MinRes Air was granted its own air operator's certificate in December 2025. In July 2024 a former Air France Airbus A320 was leased. By November 2026, the fleet consisted of one A319 and three A320s with flights operating from Perth to Kens Bore, Wodgina, Newman and Kalgoorlie.
