= Bald Hill Lithium and Tantalum Mine =

Lithium mine in Western Australia

- Location in Western Australia
- Interactive map of Bald Hill Lithium and Tantalum Mine
- Location: Widgiemooltha, Western Australia, Australia; 31.52°S 122.18°E
- Products: Spodumene
- Opened: 2018
- Active: 2018-19, 2022-24
- Closed: 2024
- Company: Mineral Resources
- Website: www.mineralresources.com.au

The Bald Hill Lithium and Tantalum Mine is a lithium mine in Australia. It was operated previously as a tantalum mine by Haddington International Resources. The mine comprises approximately 774 square kilometres in Western Australia's Eastern Goldfields Coolgardie municipal area. It is located approximately 60 kilometres south-east of Kambalda and 50 kilometres east of Widgiemooltha.

In 2019 Bald Hill Lithium and Tantalum Mine was funded to production with existing lithium offtake agreements in place with Hong Kong based Burwill Holdings. However, the mine ceased production in late 2019.

In November 2022, the mine reopened. In November 2024, the mine was closed and put into care and maintenance after a collapse in lithium prices.

== Ownership ==
The Bald Hill Lithium and Tantalum Mine was jointly owned by Tawana Resources and Alliance Mineral Assets, who merged in 2018. The combined company initially traded as Alliance Mineral Assets, changing its name to Alita Resources in July 2019. Alita Resources was placed in voluntary administration in August 2019. The company failed when the mine continued to operate but the offtake partner stopped accepting shipments.

In November 2023, the mine was sold to Mineral Resources.

== Reserves and resources ==
The Bald Hill Lithium and Tantalum Mine has reserves amounting to 11.3 million tonnes (25 billion pounds) grading 1.01% lithium and 160 parts per million tantalum for 114,100 tonnes (250 million pounds) in contained lithium and 1,800 tonnes (4 million pounds) of contained tantalum. The increased reserve underpins an initial nine-year mine life. The contained lithium resource is estimated to be 26.5 megatonnes (58 billion pounds) grading 0.96% lithium, 149 parts per million tantalum for 255,200 tonnes (560 million pounds) of contained lithium and 3.9 thousand tonnes (8.6 million pounds) of contained tantalum. Additionally, with the ongoing infill drilling program, further upgrades are targeted for later this year.
