= Chris Ellison (businessman) =

New Zealand entrepreneur (born c.1957)

- Born: c. 1957; New Zealand
- Education: Otago Boys' High School
- Occupation: Entrepreneur
- Known for: Founder of Mineral Resources

Christopher James Ellison MNZM (born c. 1957) is a New Zealand entrepreneur known as the founder of Australian mining services company Mineral Resources.

== Early life ==
Ellison was born in New Zealand. He grew up on a farm outside of Dunedin and attended Otago Boys' High School, leaving school in 1972 at the age of 15.

== Business career ==
=== Early ventures ===
In 1978, Ellison moved to Karratha, Western Australia, where he established rigging firm Karratha Rigging and won a contract to work on the North West Shelf Venture. He was managing director until 1982, when he sold the firm to Walter Wright Industries and subsequently became general manager of its WA/NT division. In 1986 he established Genco Ltd, which was acquired by engineering firm Monadelphous Group in 1988. Ellison became a substantial shareholder in Monadelphous as a result of the acquisition, but the company collapsed in the early 1990s and left him financially ruined.

=== Mineral Resources ===
In 2006, Ellison and others established Mineral Resources as a merger of three mining services firms: pipeline contractor PIHA, ore-crushing firm Crushing Services International (CSI), and Process Minerals International (PMI). Ellison was a major shareholder in each of the three. Mineral Resources was floated on the Australian Stock Exchange (ASX) in 2006 at 90 cents per share. By 2022 the company's share price had risen to an all-time high of over $71 per share, with Ellison holding around 12 percent of the company.

In 2023, Ellison's compensation as managing director of Mineral Resources was AU$6 million.

In 2024, Ellison attracted attention for comments he made during a financial results presentation at Mineral Resources. Opposing any form of remote work, Ellison said he wanted to "hold them [staff] captive all day long. I don’t want them leaving the building … I don’t want them walking down the road for a cup of coffee. We kind of figured out a few years ago how much that cost."

In October 2024, Ellison admitted to being involved in a tax evasion scheme.

=== Other activities ===
As of 2022, Ellison owned a 10 percent stake in ASX-listed rare earths explorer VHM Limited. In September 2023 he was appointed non-executive chairman of ASX-listed explorer Delta Lithium Ltd after Mineral Resources acquired a controlling stake.

== Personal life ==
In 2009, Ellison bought a riverside mansion in Mosman Park, Perth, for an Australian record price of $57.5 million (equivalent to $88.2 million in 2022). The property was bought from mining heiress Angela Bennett. In 2022 he and former Mineral Resources board member Tim Roberts purchased an agricultural property near Queenstown, New Zealand, for over NZ$30 million.

Ellison was appointed as New Zealand's honorary consul in Western Australia in 2013. He was appointed a Member of the New Zealand Order of Merit in the 2022 Queen's Birthday Honours, for "services to New Zealand–Australia relations".

=== Net worth ===
Ellison became a notional billionaire in 2020, when shares in Mineral Resources hit a then record high. However, the share price plummeted heavily during 2024 and 2025, with Ellison's net worth assessed at A$871 million by the Australian Financial Review in the 2025 Rich List.

Year	Financial Review Rich List		Forbes Australia's 50 Richest	
Year	Rank	Net worth (A$)	Rank	Net worth (US$)
2018	98 ▲	$0.78 billion ▲		
2019	148 ▼	$0.66 billion ▼		
2020	103 ▲	$1.00 billion ▲		
2021	87 ▲	$1.29 billion ▲		
2022	64 ▲	$1.80 billion ▲		
2023	55 ▲	$2.25 billion ▲		
2024		$2.10 billion ▼		
2025	175 ▼	$871 million ▼		

Legend
Icon	Description
Steady	Has not changed from the previous year
▲	Has increased from the previous year
▼	Has decreased from the previous year
