= Regional Development Commissions Act 1993 =

Parliament of Western Australia
- Long title: An Act to establish regional development commissions to co-ordinate and promote the economic development of regions of Western Australia, to provide for the establishment of regional development advisory committees, to establish a Regional Development Council, to continue existing regional development bodies as commissions under this Act, to repeal certain Acts and for related purposes.
- Citation: No. 53 of 1993
- Royal assent: 22 December 1993

Map of the regions

The Regional Development Commissions Act 1993 is legislation passed by the Parliament of Western Australia:

to establish regional development commissions, to coordinate and promote the development of regions and to establish a regional development council.

The act falls under the control of the Minister for Local Government and Regional Development and provides for the establishment of nine commissions:

- Gascoyne Development Commission
- Goldfields–Esperance Development Commission
- Great Southern Development Commission
- Kimberley Development Commission
- Mid West Development Commission
- Peel Development Commission
- Pilbara Development Commission
- South West Development Commission
- Wheatbelt Development Commission

== See also ==
- Regions of Western Australia
