= Great Southern (Western Australia) =

Region of Western Australia

- Region
- Interactive map of Great Southern
- Coordinates: 35°S 117°E
- Country: Australia
- State: Western Australia
- LGA: List; City of Albany; Shire of Broomehill–Tambellup; Shire of Cranbrook; Shire of Denmark; Shire of Gnowangerup; Shire of Jerramungup; Shire of Katanning; Shire of Kent; Shire of Kojonup; Shire of Plantagenet; Shire of Woodanilling

Government
  - State electorates: Albany; Roe; Warren-Blackwood
  - Federal division: O'Connor

The Great Southern region is one of the nine regions of Western Australia, as defined by the Regional Development Commissions Act 1993, for the purposes of economic development. It is a section of the larger south coast of Western Australia and neighbouring agricultural regions.

The region officially comprises the local government areas of Albany, Broomehill-Tambellup, Cranbrook, Denmark, Gnowangerup, Jerramungup, Katanning, Kent, Kojonup, Plantagenet, and Woodanilling.

The Great Southern has an area of 39,007 square kilometres (15,061 sq mi) and a population of about 54,000. Its administrative centre is the historic port of Albany. It has a Mediterranean climate, with hot, dry summers and cool, wet winters. The Stirling Range is the only place in Western Australia that regularly receives snowfalls, if only very light.

The economy of the Great Southern is dominated by livestock farming, dairy farming and crop-growing. It has some of the most productive cereal grain and pastoral land in the state, and is a major producer of wool and lamb. Albany is a major fishing centre.

The coast of the Great Southern has milder summer weather than areas on the west coast proper and is also a popular destination for holidaymakers, tourists, anglers, and surfers. Albany is home to the Kalgan River which is associated with riverboats, from 1918 to 1935 with Silver Star which lowered its funnel to get under a bridge, and today with Kalgan Queen which lowers its roof to pass beneath the same bridge.

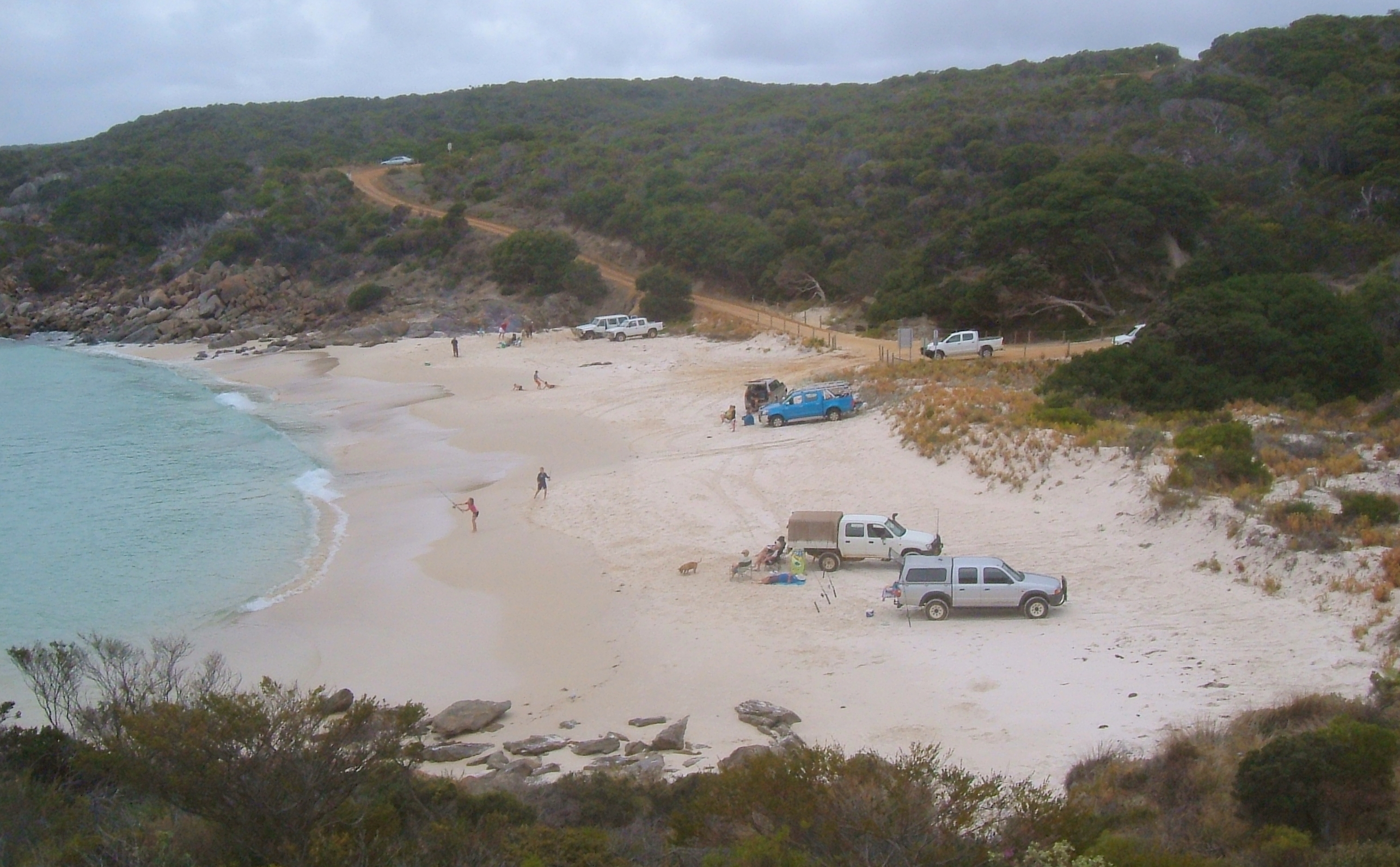
Recreational beach fishing at Dillon Bay, near Bremer Bay. Fishing, tourism and leisure are significant industries in the Great Southern region.

Noongar people have inhabited the region for tens of thousands of years. European settlement began with the establishment of a temporary British military base, commanded by Major Edmund Lockyer, at King George Sound (Albany) on Christmas Day, 1826. Albany is consequently regarded as the oldest European colonial settlement in Western Australia.

== See also ==
- Great Southern Wine Region
