= Spinifex Ridge mine =

Iron ore mine in Western Australia

- Location in Western Australia
- Interactive map of Spinifex Ridge mine
- Location: Shire of East Pilbara, Pilbara, Western Australia, Australia; 20°53′18″S 120°04′39″E
- Products: Iron ore
- Opened: 2010
- Closed: 2014
- Company: Young Australian Mines
- Website: https://www.yamines.com.au/

Spinifex Ridgem mine is an inactive iron ore mine in the Pilbara region of Australia, northeast of Marble Bar.

== Overview ==
Moly Mines awarded production contracts to BGC Contracting in August 2010. Initially, there were plans for an open-pit molybdenum/copper mine producing 20 million tonnes (44 billion pounds) per year; With changes in the price of molybdenum, this was downsized to 10 million tonnes (22 billion pounds) per year.

Port facilities at Port Hedland were commissioned in September 2010

Iron ore mining began in November 2010; ramping up to a throughput of 1 million tonnes (2.2 billion pounds) per year.

The mine had been the subject of a legal dispute during and after the final stages of production. Moly Mines had conducted a mine gate sales agreement with Mineral Resources, under which the latter paid A$35 million in advance for an expected 2.4 million tonnes of iron ore from the mine. Concluded in 2013, the deal was to extend to the completion of mining at Spinifex Ridge, with a final payment in the range of A$3 million due upon this. As part of this agreement, Moly Mines accepted that it could potentially owe money to Mineral Resources, depending on the amount and quality of the ore mined. In November 2015, an expert adviser concluded that Moly Mining owned Mineral Resources for $4.2 million, a sum the former disputed. Subsequently, Mineral Resources launched legal action in the Western Australian Supreme Court on 24 December 2015, claiming A$4.9 million. At the time, Moly Mines had A$72.7 million in cash available to invest in another project. The dispute was eventually settled in August 2017 in favour of Moly Mines.

As of 2022, the mine is placed in care and maintenance, having operated from 2010 to 2014, and being owned by the former Moly Mines, renamed Young Australian Mines in 2018.

A separate molybdenum/copper project nearby, also owned by Young Australian Mines, remains undeveloped.
