= Jack Hills mine =

Iron ore mine in Western Australia

Jack Hills iron ore mine
- Location in Western Australia
- Interactive map of Jack Hills iron ore mine
- Location: Mid West, Western Australia, Australia; 26°03′05″S 117°14′30″E
- Products: Iron ore (haematite)
- Opened: 2006
- Closed: 2012
- Company: Sinosteel (2019– ) Mitsubishi Corporation (2012–2019); Mitsubishi 50%, Murchison Metals 50% (2007–2012); Murchison Metals (2006–2007)
- Website: https://smcl.com.au/projects/jack-hills/

The Jack Hills mine is a haematite iron ore mine located 400 kilometres (250 mi) northeast of Geraldton and 165 kilometres (103 mi) northwest of Cue in the Mid West region of Western Australia. Murchison Metals began mining operations at Jack Hills on 21 September 2006, with a projected mine life of five years. The first shipment of ore was made in February 2007. Ore was trucked by road to the port of Geraldton for export. Mining was suspended in November 2012 and the project was placed on care and maintenance in June 2013.

The Jack Hills mine was initially owned and operated by Murchison Metals. Mitsubishi Corporation paid Murchison Metals A$150 million for an initial 50% stake in the mine in 2007 and a further A$325 million for the remainder in 2012. In 2019 the inactive project was sold to Sinosteel Ocean Capital.
