= Atlas Iron =

Mining company in Western Australia

Atlas Iron Limited
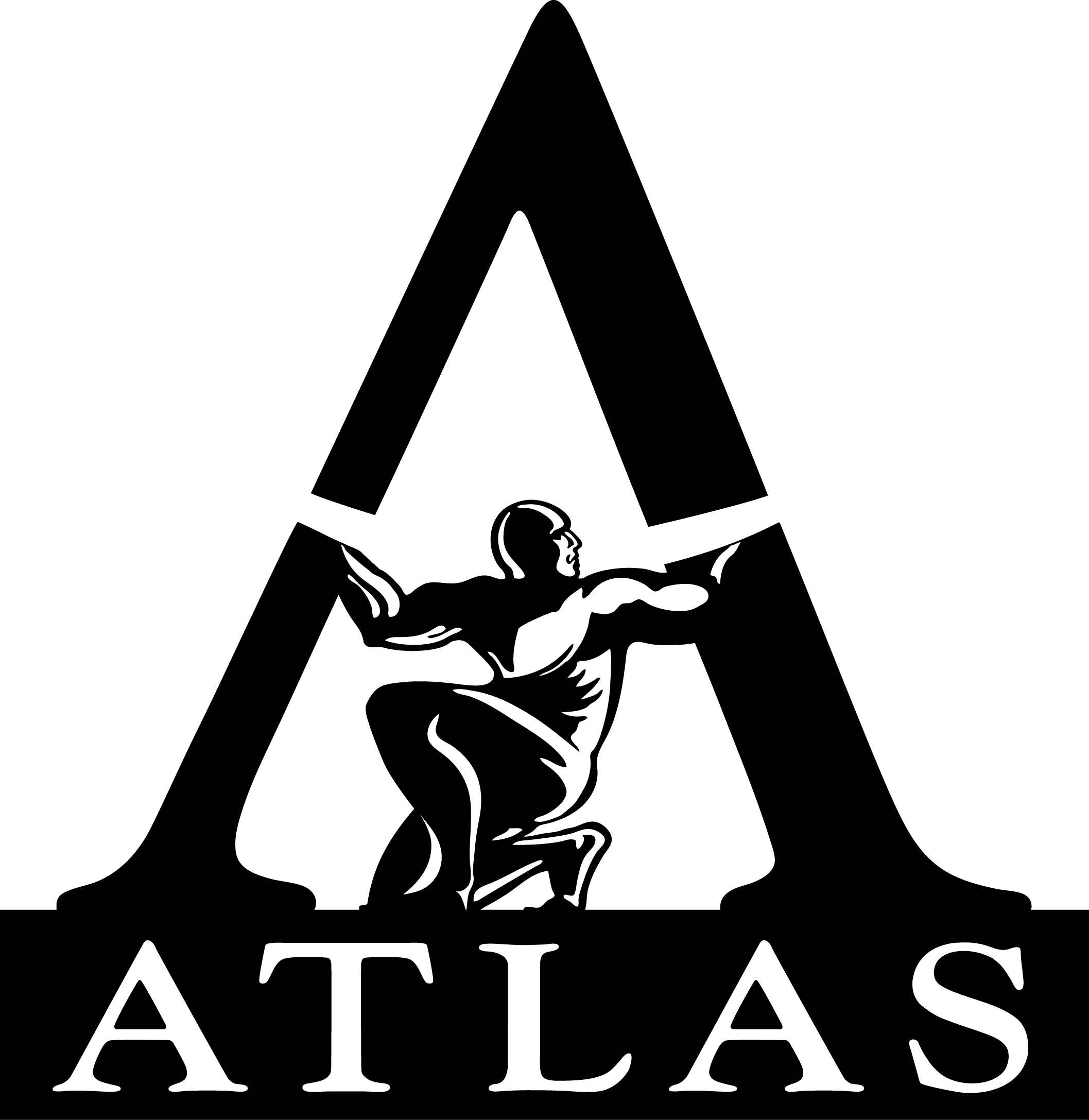
- Formerly: Atlas Gold Limited
- Type: Public
- Traded as: ASX: AGO
- Industry: Resources
- Genre: Mining
- Founded: 2004
- Founder: David Flanagan
- Headquarters: Perth, Australia
- Key people: Cliff Lawrenson (Managing Director)
- Products: Iron ore; Lithium
- Number of employees: Approx 600
- Website: www.atlasiron.com.au

Atlas Iron is an Australian mining company and an iron ore explorer, developer and producer, predominantly active in the Pilbara region and is owned by Redstone Resources, a fully owned subsidiary of Hancock Prospecting. The company operates three iron ore mines in Western Australia. In 2018 Atlas will expand its operation to start processing Lithium in a deal with Pilbara Minerals.

== History ==
Atlas was listed on the Australian Securities Exchange on 17 December 2004, under the name of Atlas Gold Limited. On 30 March 2006, the company changed its name to Atlas Iron Limited. The shares were traded under the AGO code.

Atlas became Australia's newest iron ore producer when it commenced production at Pardoo in late 2008.

The company plans to lift production from its Pilbara operations to 12 million tonnes of iron ore by 2014. Of these, 10 million tonnes are scheduled to come from the new Turner River hub, which is to blend and process ore from the company's northern Pilbara projects, located at Wodgina, Abydos and Mt Webber.

In December 2010, Atlas Iron made a bid to buy Giralia Resources; it may be possible to merge Atlas' Mt Webber mine with Giralia's nearby Dalton mine.

Atlas entered a mine gate sale agreement with Pilbara Minerals to receive direct shipping ore from Pilgangoora in December 2017.

In October 2018 Atlas was acquired by Redstone Resources, a fully owned subsidiary of Hancock Prospecting, and delisted from the Australian Securities Exchange on 21 November 2018.

== Mines ==
As of 2021, the company operates three mines, while four previously operating mines have been shut down because the resources were depleted. The operating mines are the Mt Webber mine, Sanjiv Ridge mine (formerly Corunna Downs) and Miralga Creek mine, with the later commencing mining in late February 2022. The formerly operating Pardoo, Wodgina, Abydos and Mt Dove mines have all been closed down.
