= Tallering Peak =

Iron ore mine in Western Australia

Tallering Peak Mine
- Location in Western Australia
- Interactive map of Tallering Peak Mine
- Location: Western Australia, Australia; 28°06′49″S 115°36′46″E
- Products: Iron ore
- Opened: 2004
- Closed: 2014
- Company: Mount Gibson Mining

Tallering Peak is a feature near Mount Gibson in Western Australia

Tallering Peak Mine was an iron ore mine operating in the Mid West region of Western Australia between 2003 and 2014. It was the first operational mine of Mount Gibson Mining Company.

From 2004, iron ore was transported to Geraldton, during the operational life of the mine. The operations were in conjunction with the local Aboriginal corporation. Recognition of the area having iron deposits had occurred as early as the 1920s. The deposits were also reported as the Tallering Range Iron Ore Deposits.

The area had been of interest in the 1930s for signs of gold deposits.

Western Mining had worked on developing the ore body in the 1960s.
