= Iron Valley mine =

Iron ore mine in Western Australia

- Location in Western Australia
- Interactive map of Iron Valley mine
- Location: Shire of East Pilbara, Pilbara, Western Australia, Australia; 22°43′50″S 119°19′06″E
- Products: Iron ore
- Production: 7 million tonnes/annum
- Opened: 2014
- Company: Mineral Resources Limited
- Website: http://www.mineralresources.com.au

The Iron Valley mine is a small iron ore mine located in the Pilbara region of Western Australia, 75 kilometres (47 mi) northwest of Newman, 270 kilometres (170 mi) south of Port Hedland, and 10 kilometres (6 mi) east of the Yandicoogina mine.

== Overview ==
Iron ore mines in the Pilbara region

BCI Minerals acquired the project when it took over its previous owner, Iron Ore Holdings in 2014, which, in turn, had been majority owned by Australian businessman Kerry Stokes. Prior to the sale, the deposit of at least 160 million tonnes was seen as large enough to interest one of the three large iron ore miners in the Pilbara, BHP, Fortescue Metals or Rio Tinto, with all three having mining leases in the area around the Iron Valley deposit.

The mine opened in August 2014, when the project had a JORC resource probable ore reserve of 134 million tonnes at 58.5% iron. As at 30 June 2019, the ore resource was 189.9 million tonnes at 58.0% Fe, and the ore reserve was 89.0 million tonnes at 58.3% iron.

The mine is operated by Mineral Resources Limited with a royalty interest to BCI Minerals. Under the terms of the agreement, Mineral Resources is obliged to pay BCI a minimum royalty of A$1.5 million per quarter, whether the mine is in production or not, with the former also footing the all cost of operations. In 2020, BCI Minerals agreed to share some of the expenses required allow the mine to continue to operate.

The operations of the mine are part of various strategies of collaboration between larger operators in the region After mining and screening, lump and fines ore products are transported by road train to the Utah Point bulk Handling facility at Port Hedland. The mine has an annual ore production rate of 7 million tonnes, with a mine life of more than 10 years at the current rate. The mine has a camp at the nearby Phil's Creek location.
