= Pardoo mine =

Mine in Western Australia

- Location in Western Australia
- Location: Port Hedland, Western Australia, Australia; 20°14′51″S 119°07′27″E
- Products: Iron ore
- Production: 2.4 million tonnes/annum
- Opened: 2008
- Closed: 2013
- Company: Atlas Iron
- Website: Atlas website

The Pardoo mine was an iron ore mine located in the Pilbara region of Western Australia, 75 kilometres east of Port Hedland.

The mine was fully owned and operated by Atlas Iron and was, at the time of commencement of production, the company's only operational mine. Atlas Iron is an iron ore explorer, developer and producer, predominantly active in the Pilbara region.

Atlas Iron is a minor iron ore mining company, especially compare to the three big Pilbara iron ore miners, BHP, Rio Tinto and Fortescue Metals Group.

== Overview ==
Iron ore mines in the Pilbara region

The mine commenced production in October 2008 and was the first producing mine to be operated by Atlas Iron. Ore is crushed and screened on site before being hauled by road trains to Port Hedland, where the ore is shipped from. The mine cost A$12 million to develop but, on start up of production, was troubled by the Great Recession, with Atlas having hoped to sell its production on the spot market. Falling demands at the time however proved to be a challenge for the company as it had to find buyers for its ore. Atlas was able to recover from this position and, by the second half of 2009, sharply increasing revenue from its mine.

Mining was carried out in an open pit operation. In its first year of operation, the mine produced 1.08 million tonnes of ore, but in full production, the mine was scheduled to produce 2.4 million tonnes of iron ore annually.

In 2010, Atlas commenced production on its Wodgina mine, also located in the Pilbara. The company planned to lift production from its Pilbara operations to 12 million tonnes of iron ore by 2012, up from 6.5 million tonnes in late 2010. Of these, 10 million tonnes were scheduled to come from the new Turner River hub, which was to blend and process ore from the company's northern Pilbara projects, located at Wodgina, Abydos and Mt Webber.

Atlas was hopeful to come to terms with BHP in regards to using the company's rail infrastructure, the Goldsworthy railway. BHP, in late 2010, had agreed to a joint feasibility study into how an arrangement might work.

The mine, consisting of the mine infrastructure, eleven open pits and six waste stockpiles, was closed in 2013 after its resources were depleted.
