= Sinosteel =

Chinese state owned company

Sinosteel Corporation

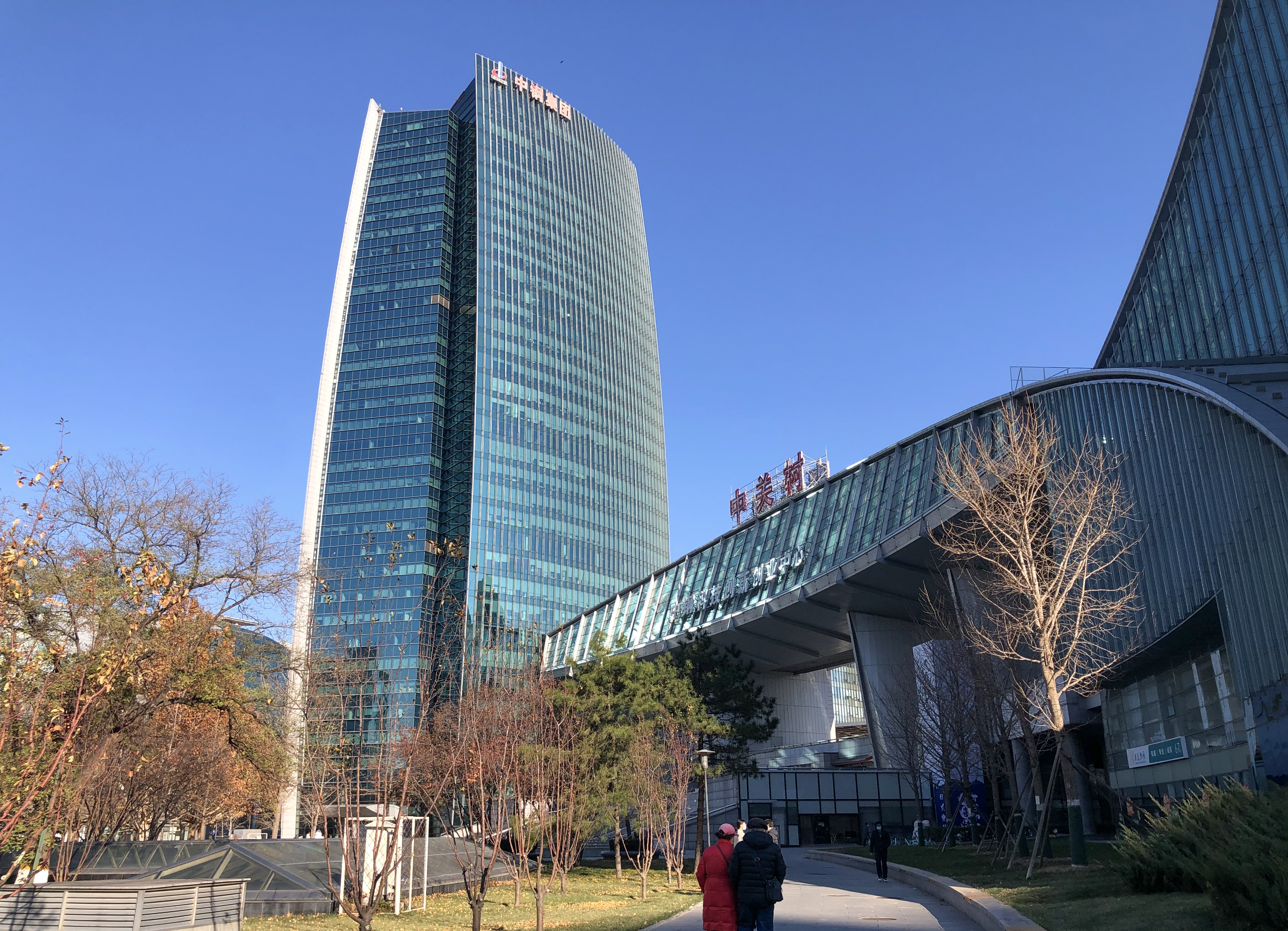
- Sinosteel Headquarters
- Type: State-owned enterprise
- Industry: Mineral trading and logistics, construction and engineering, mining, equipment manufacturing
- Founded: 1993; 33 years ago
- Headquarters: Sinosteel Plaza, Haidian District, Beijing, China
- Key people: Huang Tianwen (President); Zhimin Li (Vice President)
- Owner: Baowu
- Website: sinosteel.com

Sinosteel Corporation (S: 中国中钢集团公司, T: 中國中鋼集團公司, P: Zhōngguó Zhōnggāng Jítuán Gōngsī) is a state-owned enterprise, primarily in mining, trading, equipment manufacturing and engineering. Founded in 1993 and based in the People's Republic of China, it is the country's second largest importer of iron ore. The company used to be under the direct supervision of the State-owned Assets Supervision and Administration Commission. In 2022, it was acquired by state-owned steel conglomerate Baowu.

== Organization ==
There are 86 subsidiaries under the administration of Sinosteel, among which 63 are in China and 23 abroad. Sinosteel is mainly engaged in mining and processing of minerals; related trading and logistics; construction, engineering, and technical service; and equipment manufacture. It operates in Algeria, Australia, South Africa, India, Singapore, Brazil, the European Union, Gabon, Cambodia, Indonesia, Vietnam, Turkey, Hong Kong, and Macao.

=== Mining and processing ===
The company has iron and chrome mines in Australia and South Africa.

=== Trading and logistics ===
Sinosteel possesses a global-running sales network and logistic service system. It is the raw material supplier and sales-agent for a number of Chinese steel mills, some of which Sinosteel has entered into long-term strategic partnership. The company offers ferrous metal minerals, non-metal minerals, and coke and coal; feedstock, such as scrap, pig iron, and heavy crude oil; steel/finished steel products, including steel/semi-finished steel products, steel wire products, and steel grating; and ferro-alloys.

It acts an agent for many Chinese and international equipment and technology suppliers, providing investment development, future brokerage, bidding services for Chinese steel mills, goods transportation, insurance, cargo agent, storage and port and wharf services.

=== Manufacturing ===
It also provides manufacturing equipment, such as mining, rotating and sintering, iron making, and steel making and refining equipment; submerged-arch furnace; and continuous casting, rolling, carbon mechanical and electrical, and refractory manufacturing equipment. In addition, the company offers refractories for steel making industry, petrochemical industry, non-ferrous industry, cement industry, and glass industry. Further, it provides carbon products, electro-magnetic material, and non-ferrous metals.

=== Engineering and technical services ===
The scientific and technological companies under Sinosteel operate in the areas of geological exploration, beneficiation, heat engineering, environmental protection, refractory materials, metal products and engineering design. Its engineering and construction arm is Sinosteel Equipment & Engineering Co. Ltd., which in 2012 had revenue of $1.09 billion, making it the 188th largest construction and engineering firm in the world. International revenue accounted for $271.3 million of the overall total.

== History ==
The company was founded in 1993 as China Iron & Steel Trade & Industry Group Corporation and changed its name to Sinosteel Corporation in August 2004. Sinosteel Corporation is based in Beijing, China.

Sinosteel in 2008 completed a hostile takeover of Australian iron ore producer, Midwest Corporation, cornering 51% of the shares of the company in a A$1.36 billion acquisition. It was the first successful hostile takeover of an Australian public company by a Chinese company.

In 2016, due to heavy debt of 60 million yuan owed to financial institutions, Sinosteel was greenlit for swapping 27 billion yuan of its debt for equity convertible bonds under a new government policy designed to curb run-away corporate debt in the economy.

In 2022, Sinosteel was acquired and became a subsidiary of Baowu, a fellow state-owned Chinese enterprise that is the world's biggest steel maker.
