= Miralga Creek mine =

Iron ore mine in Western Australia

- Location in Western Australia
- Interactive map of Miralga Creek mine
- Location: Shire of East Pilbara, Western Australia, Australia; 21°00′17″S 119°19′04″E
- Products: Iron ore
- Production: 2 million tonnes (4.4 billion pounds) per annum
- Opened: 2022
- Company: Atlas Iron
- Website: https://www.atlasiron.com.au/

The Miralga Creek mine is an iron ore mine operated by Atlas Iron and located in the Pilbara region of Western Australia, 100 kilometres (62 mi) south-east from Port Hedland. Ore from the mine is transported overland via road train to the Utah Point Bulk Commodities Berth at Port Hedland.

== Overview ==
Iron ore mines in the Pilbara region

The Miralga Creek mine is located in the vicinity of the former Abydos mine, operated by Atlas from 2011 to 2016 at a production rate of approximately 3 million tonnes (6.6 billion pounds) per annum. The new mine utilizes the existing infrastructure of the former mine, specifically the camp and bore fields. Mining is to be conducted in five open pits, spread over three areas, with the crushed ore then transported by road train to the Utah Point Bulk Commodities Berth at Port Hedland.

The mine is scheduled to operate for around four years and to produce 8 million tonnes (18 billion pounds) of iron ore in this time. Construction at the mine started in July 2021, and commenced mining in late February 2022, slightly ahead of schedule.

Part of the mining operations will be carried out by a company operated by the traditional owners of the region, the Nyamal people.
