= Wodgina mine =

Former iron ore mine in Western Australia

- Location in Western Australia
- Location: Pilbara, Western Australia, Australia; 21°10′52″S 118°40′31″E
- Products: Iron ore fines, lithium direct shipping ore, and spodumene concentrate
- Production: 6,057,086 tonnes
- Financial year: 2013-2014 (peak year)
- Opened: 2010 (Iron ore); 2019 (Lithium)
- Closed: 2017 (Iron ore project, care and maintenance)
- Company: Mineral Resources Limited
- Website: www.mineralresources.com.au
- Acquired: 2017

The Wodgina mine is an open-pit lithium mining operation located 90 kilometres south of Port Hedland in the Pilbara region of Western Australia. The project also produced iron ore from 2010 to 2017 before reserves were exhausted.

The current lithium project is a 50:50 joint venture between Mineral Resources and the Albemarle Corporation. The previous iron ore project mine was operated by Atlas Iron Limited. The facilities and tenements are shared, by contract, with Global Advanced Metals.

== Overview ==
Iron ore mines in the Pilbara region

Atlas purchased the iron ore rights for the Wodgina Project from Talison Minerals Pty Ltd, now known as Global Advanced Metals, in February 2008.

The project was fast tracked by Atlas, going from the first drilling program to production in just over one and a half years. The company was aided by the ability to use the existing but dormant processing infrastructure of the tantalum mine owned by Talison (Global Advanced Metals) in the area. At the time, the tantalum mine had been placed on care and maintenance by Global Advanced Metals and in January 2011, the company announced that it would restart tantalum production. Less than a year after it reopened, due to softening global demand, tantalum mining operations ceased at the end of February 2012.

In July 2010, Atlas commenced production at the Wodgina mine. The company planned to lift production from its Pilbara operations to 20 million tonnes of iron ore by 2012, up from 6.5 million tonnes in late 2010. Of this, 10 million tonnes were expected to come from the new Turner River hub, which was to blend and process ore from the company's northern Pilbara projects, located at Wodgina, Abydos and Mt Webber.

Atlas was hopeful to come to terms with BHP Billiton for the use of that company's rail infrastructure, the Goldsworthy railway. BHP, in late 2010, had agreed to a joint feasibility study into how an arrangement might work.

Iron ore mining at Wodgina ceased on 5 April 2017 when reserves were exhausted. Mineral Resources purchased the asset and proceeded to construct a processing facility for the spodumene ore reserve present. Operations recommenced in early-2019 before going into care and maintenance later that same year after a price crash. Operations resumed in late-2021.
