= Pilbara =

Region of Western Australia

- Region
- Extent of Pilbara region
- Coordinates: 21°S 119°E
- Country: Australia
- State: Western Australia
- LGAs: Shire of Ashburton; Shire of East Pilbara; City of Karratha; Town of Port Hedland

Government
  - State electorates: Kimberley; Pilbara
  - Federal division: Durack

The Pilbara (/ˈpɪlbərə/) is a large, dry, sparsely populated region in the north of Western Australia. It is known for its geography, its red earth, and its vast mineral deposits, in particular iron ore. It is also a global biodiversity hotspot for subterranean fauna.

== Definitions of the Pilbara region ==
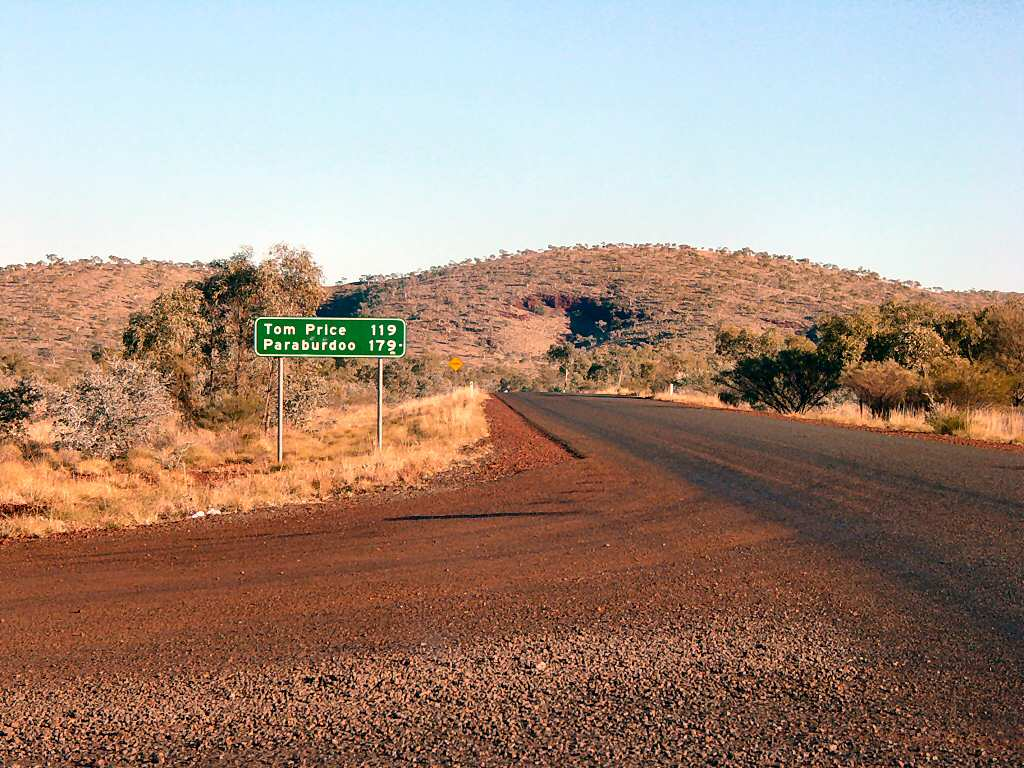
North of the Pilbara looking south at the range

At least two important but differing definitions of "the Pilbara" region exist. Administratively it is one of the nine regions of Western Australia defined by the Regional Development Commissions Act 1993; the term also refers to the Pilbara shrublands bioregion (which differs in extent) under the Interim Biogeographic Regionalisation for Australia (IBRA).

IBRA regions and subregions: IBRA7
IBRA region / subregion	IBRA code	Area	States	Location in Australia
Pilbara shrublands	PIL	17,823,126 hectares (44,041,900 acres)	WA	
Chichester	PIL01	8,374,728 hectares (20,694,400 acres)	WA	
Fortescue	PIL02	1,951,435 hectares (4,822,100 acres)	WA	
Hamersley	PIL03	5,634,727 hectares (13,923,710 acres)	WA	
Roebourne	PIL04	1,862,236 hectares (4,601,690 acres)	WA	

== Geography ==
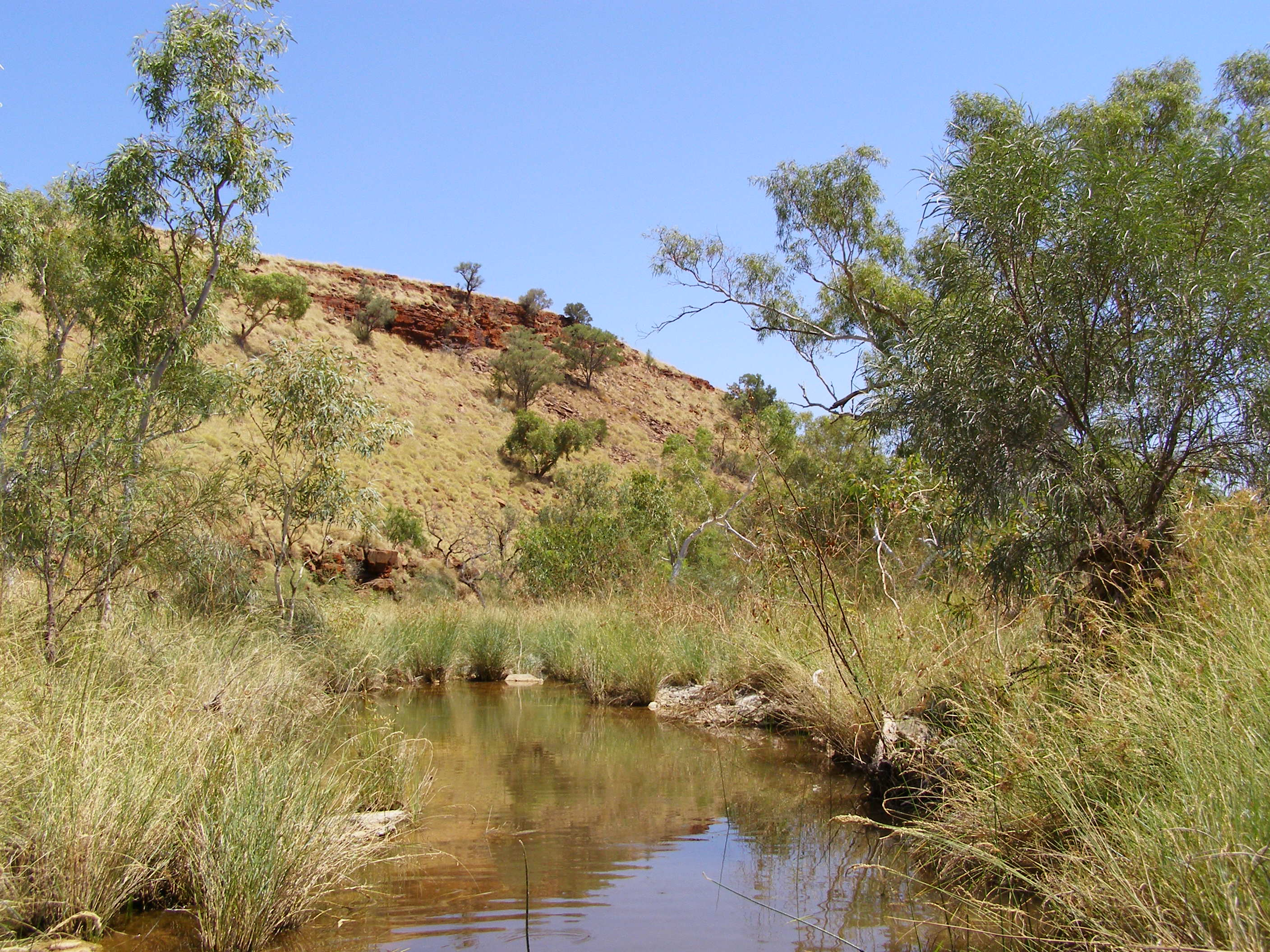
Hamersley Range

Map of Pilbara

The Pilbara region, as defined by the Regional Development Commissions Act 1993 and administered for economic development purposes by the Pilbara Development Commission, has an estimated population of 61,688 as of June 2018, and covers an area of 507,896 square kilometres (196,100 sq mi). It contains some of Earth's oldest rock formations, and includes landscapes of coastal plains and mountain ranges with cliffs and gorges. The major settlements of the region are Port Hedland, Karratha and Newman. The three main ports in this region are Port Hedland, Dampier and Port Walcott.

Under the Regional Development Commissions Act, Pilbara is situated south of the Kimberley, and comprises the local government areas of Shire of Ashburton, Shire of East Pilbara, City of Karratha, and Town of Port Hedland.

The Pilbara region covers an area of 507,896 km^{2} (193,826 mi^{2}) (including offshore islands), roughly the combined land area of the US States of California and Indiana. It has a population of more than 45,000, most of whom live in the western third of the region, in towns such as Port Hedland, Karratha, Wickham, Newman and Marble Bar. A substantial number of people also work in the region on a fly-in/fly-out basis. There are approximately 10 major/medium population centres and more than 25 smaller ones.

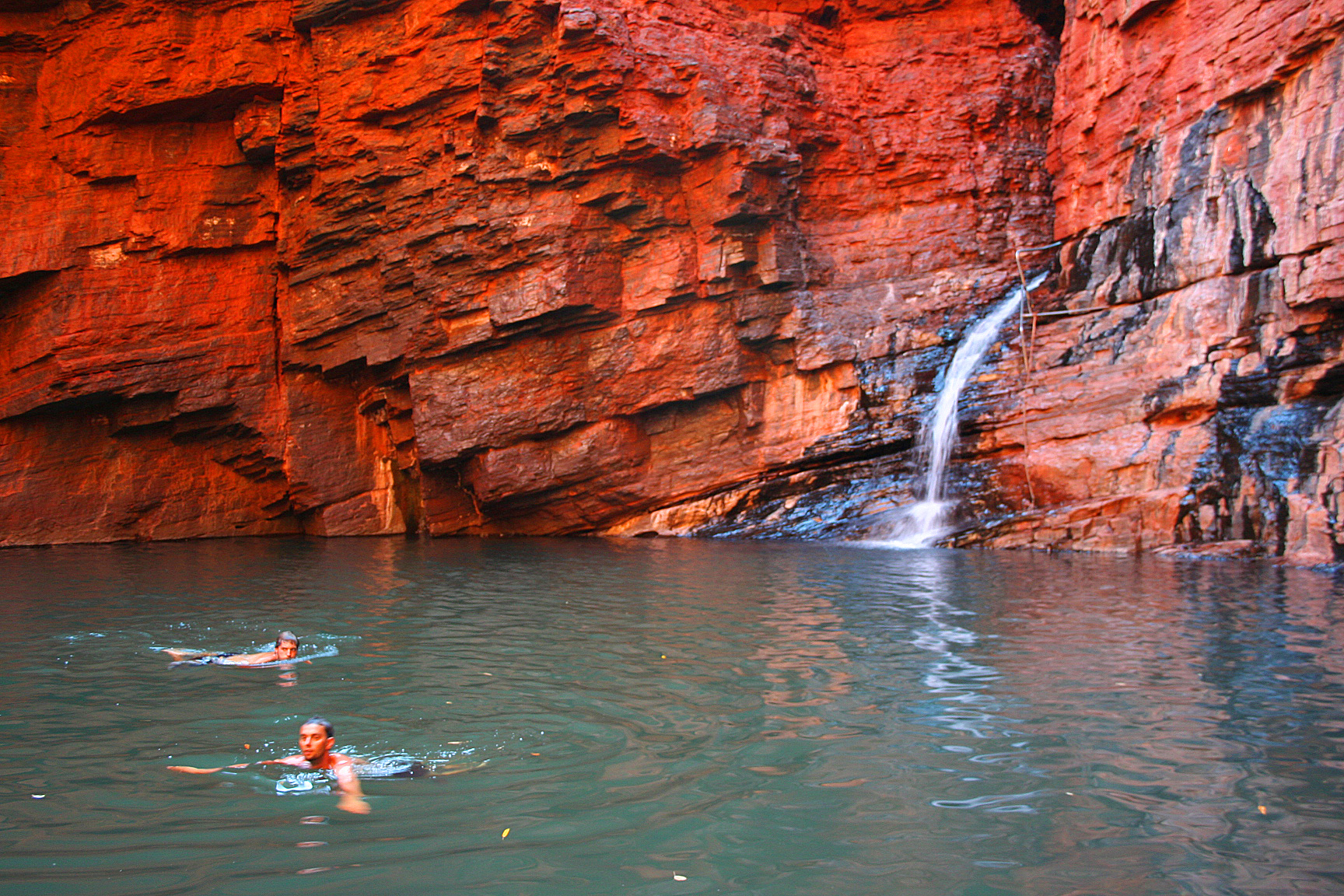
Weano Gorge in Karijini National Park

The Pilbara consists of three distinct geographic areas. The western third is the Roebourne coastal sandplain, which supports most of the region's population in towns and much of its industry and commerce. The eastern third is almost entirely desert, and is sparsely populated by a small number of Aboriginal people. The two areas are separated by the inland uplands of the Pilbara Craton, including the predominant Hamersley Range, which has numerous mining towns, the Chichester Range, and others. The uplands have many gorges and other natural attractions.

The Pilbara contains some of the world's oldest surface rocks, including the ancient fossilised remains known as stromatolites and rocks such as granites that are more than three billion years old. In 2007, some of the oldest evidence of life on Earth was found in 3.4-billion-year-old sandstones at Strelley Pool, which preserve fossils of sulphur-processing bacteria. The mineralised spheres, which were found on an ancient beach and have a cell-like morphology, were chemically analysed, revealing that they used sulphur for fuel.

An extinct genus of stromatolite-forming cyanobacteria, Pilbaria, was named after the region, where the type specimen was found.

=== Urban centres and localities ===
Rank	UCL	LGA	Population									
Rank	UCL	LGA	2001 census	Ref.	2006 census	Ref.	2011 census	Ref.	2016 census	Ref.	2021 census	Ref.
1	Karratha	Karratha	10,730		11,728		16,475		15,828		17,013	
2	Port Hedland	Port Hedland	12,695		11,557		13,772		13,828		15,298	
3	Newman	East Pilbara	3,516		4,245		5,478		4,567		4,239	
4	Tom Price	Ashburton	3,095		2,721		3,134		2,956		2,874	
5	Wickham	Karratha	1,724		1,825		1,651		1,572		2,016	
6	Paraburdoo	Ashburton	1,202		1,607		1,509		1,359		1,319	
7	Dampier	Karratha	1,469		1,370		1,341		1,104		1,282	
8	Onslow	Ashburton	802		576		667		848		813	
9	Roebourne	Karratha	950		857		813		627		700	
10	Pannawonica	Ashburton	618		686		651		695		685	
11	Jigalong	East Pilbara	300		273		357		333		289	
12	Point Samson	Karratha	322		274		298		211		235	
13	Kiwirrkurra	East Pilbara	—N/a		—N/a		216		165		180	
14	Marble Bar	East Pilbara	234		194		208		174		153	
15	Nullagine	East Pilbara	—N/a		—N/a		178		194		147	

== Local government ==
The Pilbara region, under the Pilbara Development Commission, contains four local government areas:

- Ashburton – Shire of Ashburton
- East Pilbara – Shire of East Pilbara
- Karratha – City of Karratha
- Port Hedland – Town of Port Hedland

== Etymology ==
According to the Pilbara Aboriginal Language Centre Wangka Maya, the name for the Pilbara region derives from the Aboriginal word bilybara, meaning "dry" in the Nyamal and Banyjima languages. Another suggested origin is pilbarra, an Aboriginal word for the salt-water mullet found in local waters, reflected in the name of a tributary of the Yule River, Pilbarra Creek, which evolved to "Pilbara" Creek. (Note: When Europeans first applied "Pilbarra" in 1885 to Pilbarra Creek, the emphasis was on the second syllable, reflected by the two "R"s, but over time one "R" was dropped, the first syllable was emphasised, and the name came to describe the entire region.) The Pilbara Goldfield, discovered in 1885, was named after the creek, and the name later became associated with the region.

== History ==
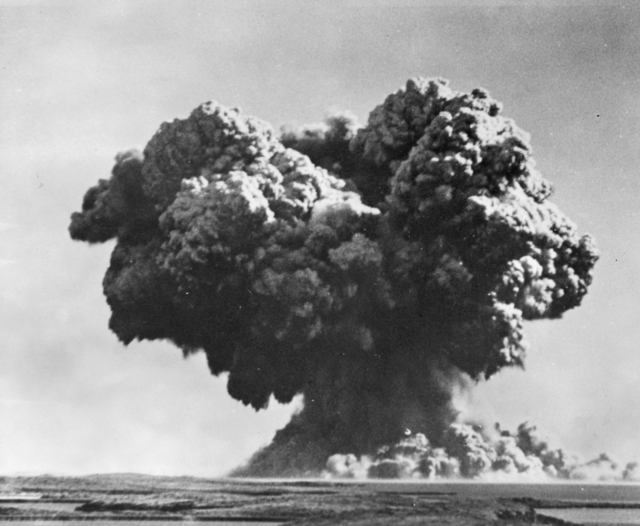
The mushroom cloud resulting from the Operation Hurricane detonation

The first European to explore the area was Francis Thomas Gregory in 1861. Within two years, European settlers had begun arriving. The region was regarded as part of the North West at first – a larger area that included the modern Kimberley and Gascoyne regions.

Settlements along the coast at Tien Tsin Harbour (later Cossack), Roebourne and Condon (officially Shellborough; later abandoned) were established over ensuing decades, mainly as centres of the rangeland livestock (grazing/pastoral) industry or pearling ports. However, as natural mother of pearl beds around Cossack were fished out, the pearling fleet began to move northward, and by 1883 it was based at Broome, in the Kimberley region. From c. 1900, pastoralism went into decline with the growth of other, more productive agricultural areas of the state.

Mining in the region started on 1 October 1888, when the Pilbara Goldfield was officially declared – named after a local creek, the goldfield would later give its name to the region as a whole. It was later divided into the Nullagine Goldfield and Marble Bar Goldfield. However, gold mining began to decline in the Pilbara in the mid-1890s, after alluvial ore had been exhausted. In 1937, mining of asbestos commenced at Wittenoom Gorge. While the presence of abundant iron ore had been known for about a century, it was not until the 1960s and the discovery of high-grade ore in the Hamersley Ranges that the area became pivotal to the state's economy, and towns built to accommodate mining and allied services boomed.

In the 1950s, three British nuclear weapons tests were carried out in the Montebello Islands, 130 km (81 mi) off the Pilbara coast.

== Aboriginal people ==
=== Prehistory ===
The Aboriginal population of the Pilbara considerably predates, by 30,000 to 40,000 years, the European colonisation of the region. Archaeological evidence indicates that people were living in the Pilbara even during the harsh climatic conditions of the Last Glacial Maximum. The early history of the first people is held within an oral tradition, archeological evidence and petroglyphs. Near the town of Dampier is a peninsula known as Murujuga, which contains a large collection of World Heritage-listed petroglyphs, dating back thousands of years. Rock art in the Pilbara appears to have been mainly etched into the hard rock surfaces, whereas on the softer sandstone in the Kimberley rock paintings predominate.

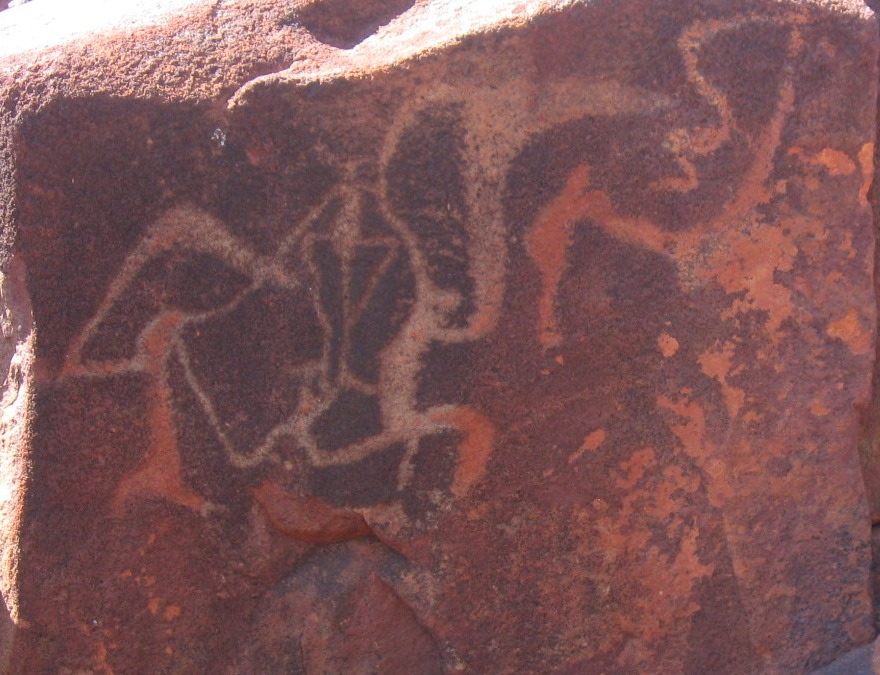
Burrup rock art

=== 20th century ===
Working conditions in the pearling and pastoral industries for Aboriginal people in the Pilbara region around 1900 have been described as slavery, with no wages paid, kidnapping as well as severe and cruel punishments for misbehaviour and absconding all common practices. Some incidents, such as the Bendu Atrocity of 1897, attracted international condemnation. The first strike by Indigenous people in Australia took place in 1946 in the Pilbara, known as the Pilbara strike or Pilbara Aboriginal strike, when Aboriginal pastoral workers walked off the stations in protest at low pay and bad working conditions, a strike that lasted for over three years.

Family clans in the Pilbara who were supported by mining prospector, Don McLeod, developed skills for mining and the concentration of rare metals. For a short period money accumulated, which according to Aboriginal law was to be used for traditional ways. Eventually the funds were used to establish an independent Aboriginal-controlled school. The concept has expanded into a movement with around 20 similar schools established in northern Western Australia by the mid-1990s. Jan Richardson, wife of Victorian Aboriginal activist Stan Davey, wrote a biography of McLeod as a doctoral thesis.

=== 21st century ===
In 2006, it was estimated that 15% of the population of the Pilbara identify as Aboriginal and/or Torres Strait Islander people, approximately 6000 people.

Many Pilbara communities face the many complex effects of colonisation, and lack adequate access to housing, health and education. A 1971 survey of 1000 Aboriginal people conducted by Pat McPherson found that most had one or more serious diseases. At the McClelland Royal Commission into British nuclear testing, Aboriginal people from the Pilbara provided evidence regarding the explosion on the Montebello Islands.

Aboriginal communities are sited over a number of different places. Many have poor infrastructure, and relations between police and Aboriginal people are often tense.

There are many Aboriginal corporations across the Pilbara, some of which administer Native Title responsibilities, and others which focus on social, health, and education outcomes. Since 2022, the Ngarluma Yindjibarndi Foundation Ltd (NYFL), under the leadership of Yindjibarndi man Michael Woodley, and CEO Sean-Paul Stephens, has become known as one of the most impactful organisations in Western Australia, given its focus on advocacy and influence on social and economic policy.

== Climate ==
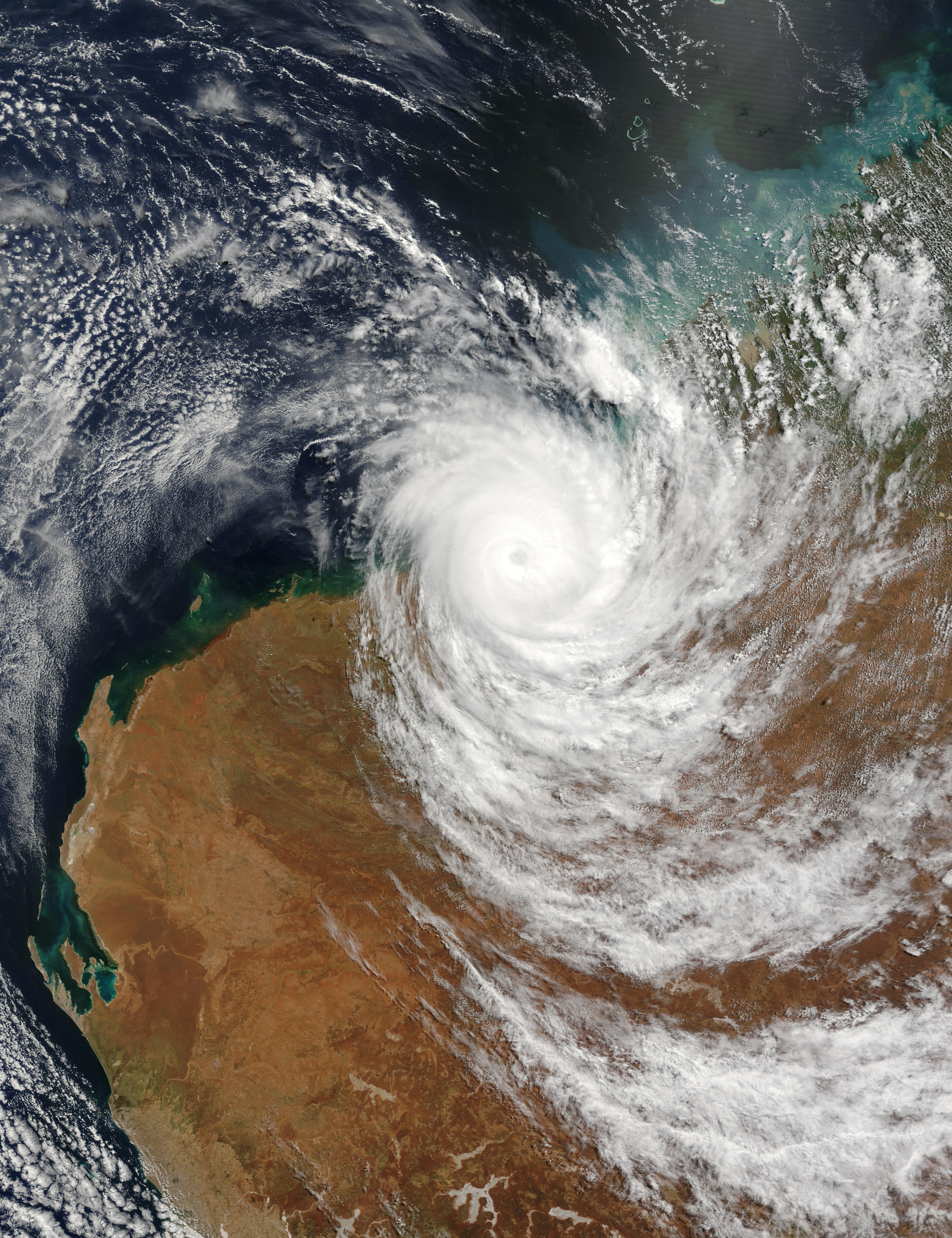
The Terra satellite captured this image of Cyclone Fay, over the Western Australian coast on 27 March 2004.

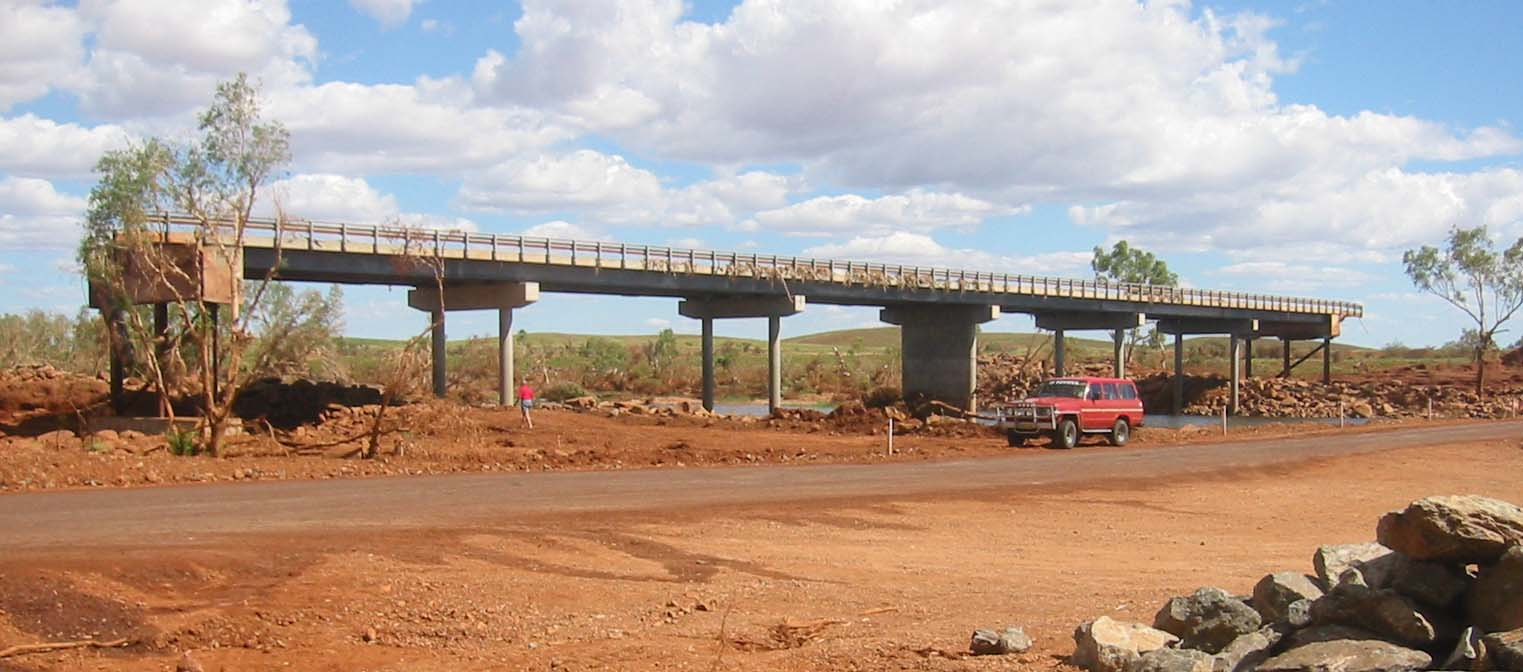
300m of North West Coastal Highway approaches to the Maitland River bridge were destroyed during Cyclone Monty in 2004

The climate of the Pilbara is arid and tropical. It experiences high temperatures and low irregular rainfall that follows the summer cyclones. During the summer months, maximum temperatures exceed 32 °C (90 °F) almost every day, and temperatures in excess of 45 °C (113 °F) are not uncommon. Winter temperatures rarely drop below 10 °C (50 °F) on the coast; however, inland temperatures as low as 0 °C (32 °F) are occasionally recorded.

The Pilbara town of Marble Bar set a world record of most consecutive days of maximum temperatures of 100 degrees Fahrenheit (37.8 degrees Celsius) or more, during a period of 160 such days from 31 October 1923 to 7 April 1924.

The average annual rainfall in the region is between 200 and 350 millimetres (7.9 and 13.8 in). Almost all of the Pilbara's rainfall occurs between December and May, usually with occasional heavy downpours in thunderstorms or tropical cyclones. The period from June to November is usually completely rainless, with warm to very hot and sunny conditions. Like most of the north coast of Australia, the coastal areas of the Pilbara experience occasional tropical cyclones. The frequency of cyclones crossing the Pilbara coast is about 7 every 10 years. Due to the low population density in the Pilbara region, cyclones rarely cause large scale destruction or loss of life.

Climate data for Port Hedland (Coastal)
Month	Jan	Feb	Mar	Apr	May	Jun	Jul	Aug	Sep	Oct	Nov	Dec	Year
Record high °C (°F)	49.0 (120.2)	48.2 (118.8)	45.9 (114.6)	42.4 (108.3)	38.8 (101.8)	35.5 (95.9)	34.4 (93.9)	36.8 (98.2)	42.2 (108.0)	46.9 (116.4)	47.4 (117.3)	47.9 (118.2)	49.0 (120.2)
Mean daily maximum °C (°F)	36.4 (97.5)	36.2 (97.2)	36.7 (98.1)	35.2 (95.4)	30.6 (87.1)	27.6 (81.7)	27.1 (80.8)	29.2 (84.6)	32.3 (90.1)	34.8 (94.6)	36.2 (97.2)	36.6 (97.9)	33.2 (91.8)
Mean daily minimum °C (°F)	25.6 (78.1)	25.5 (77.9)	24.5 (76.1)	21.4 (70.5)	17.2 (63.0)	14.1 (57.4)	12.3 (54.1)	13.1 (55.6)	15.4 (59.7)	18.4 (65.1)	21.3 (70.3)	24.0 (75.2)	19.4 (66.9)
Record low °C (°F)	18.1 (64.6)	16.3 (61.3)	15.8 (60.4)	12.2 (54.0)	7.0 (44.6)	4.7 (40.5)	3.2 (37.8)	3.7 (38.7)	7.7 (45.9)	11.1 (52.0)	12.4 (54.3)	16.6 (61.9)	3.2 (37.8)
Average rainfall mm (inches)	62.2 (2.45)	94.8 (3.73)	50.1 (1.97)	22.4 (0.88)	27.0 (1.06)	20.7 (0.81)	11.1 (0.44)	4.9 (0.19)	1.3 (0.05)	0.9 (0.04)	2.7 (0.11)	17.9 (0.70)	314.4 (12.38)
Source: Bureau of Meteorology

Climate data for Newman (Inland)
Month	Jan	Feb	Mar	Apr	May	Jun	Jul	Aug	Sep	Oct	Nov	Dec	Year
Record high °C (°F)	47.0 (116.6)	46.0 (114.8)	43.3 (109.9)	40.4 (104.7)	35.2 (95.4)	33.0 (91.4)	31.0 (87.8)	34.1 (93.4)	38.0 (100.4)	42.9 (109.2)	43.9 (111.0)	45.0 (113.0)	47.0 (116.6)
Mean daily maximum °C (°F)	39.5 (103.1)	37.2 (99.0)	35.8 (96.4)	31.6 (88.9)	27.3 (81.1)	22.9 (73.2)	23.0 (73.4)	25.8 (78.4)	30.5 (86.9)	35.0 (95.0)	37.4 (99.3)	38.9 (102.0)	32.1 (89.8)
Mean daily minimum °C (°F)	25.3 (77.5)	24.4 (75.9)	22.4 (72.3)	18.4 (65.1)	13.0 (55.4)	9.6 (49.3)	8.1 (46.6)	10.1 (50.2)	13.7 (56.7)	17.9 (64.2)	21.4 (70.5)	23.9 (75.0)	17.3 (63.1)
Record low °C (°F)	16.1 (61.0)	17.0 (62.6)	9.0 (48.2)	6.0 (42.8)	1.0 (33.8)	−1.1 (30.0)	−2.0 (28.4)	−2.0 (28.4)	1.0 (33.8)	6.0 (42.8)	11.8 (53.2)	15.2 (59.4)	−2.0 (28.4)
Average precipitation mm (inches)	57.2 (2.25)	78.9 (3.11)	41.7 (1.64)	18.4 (0.72)	18.5 (0.73)	14.6 (0.57)	15.1 (0.59)	7.7 (0.30)	3.4 (0.13)	4.7 (0.19)	10.5 (0.41)	37.4 (1.47)	312.0 (12.28)

== Economy ==
The area is known for its petroleum, natural gas and iron ore deposits, which contribute significantly to Australia's economy. Other than mining, pastoral activities as well as fishing and tourism are the main industries.

Despite an economic output of over $125 billion per year (as of 2025), the economic wellbeing of the Aboriginal community has deteriorated over the last three decades. Professor Peter Yu of the Australian National University has labeled this disparity as “economic apartheid”. Professor Marcia Langton has written about the extreme disparity between Pilbara Aboriginal communities like Ieramugadu (Roebourne), and towns like Karratha and Dampier, only 45 km away, which are home to much of the mining, oil and gas workforce.

In 2025, Seven West Media published an opinion article by Regional Development Australia (Pilbara) board member and CEO of the Ngarluma Yindjibarndi Foundation Ltd (NYFL) Sean-Paul Stephens, on the failure of the Pilbara in achieving economic reconciliation in the years since the Pilbara Strike.

The Pilbara's economy is dominated by mining exports and petroleum export industries.

During the 1970s the area was known for union militancy with many strikes and some mines operating as fully unionised 'closed shops.' This was challenged by employers from the mid-1980s onwards and the region now has a very low level of union membership compared to other parts of Australia.

=== Iron ore ===
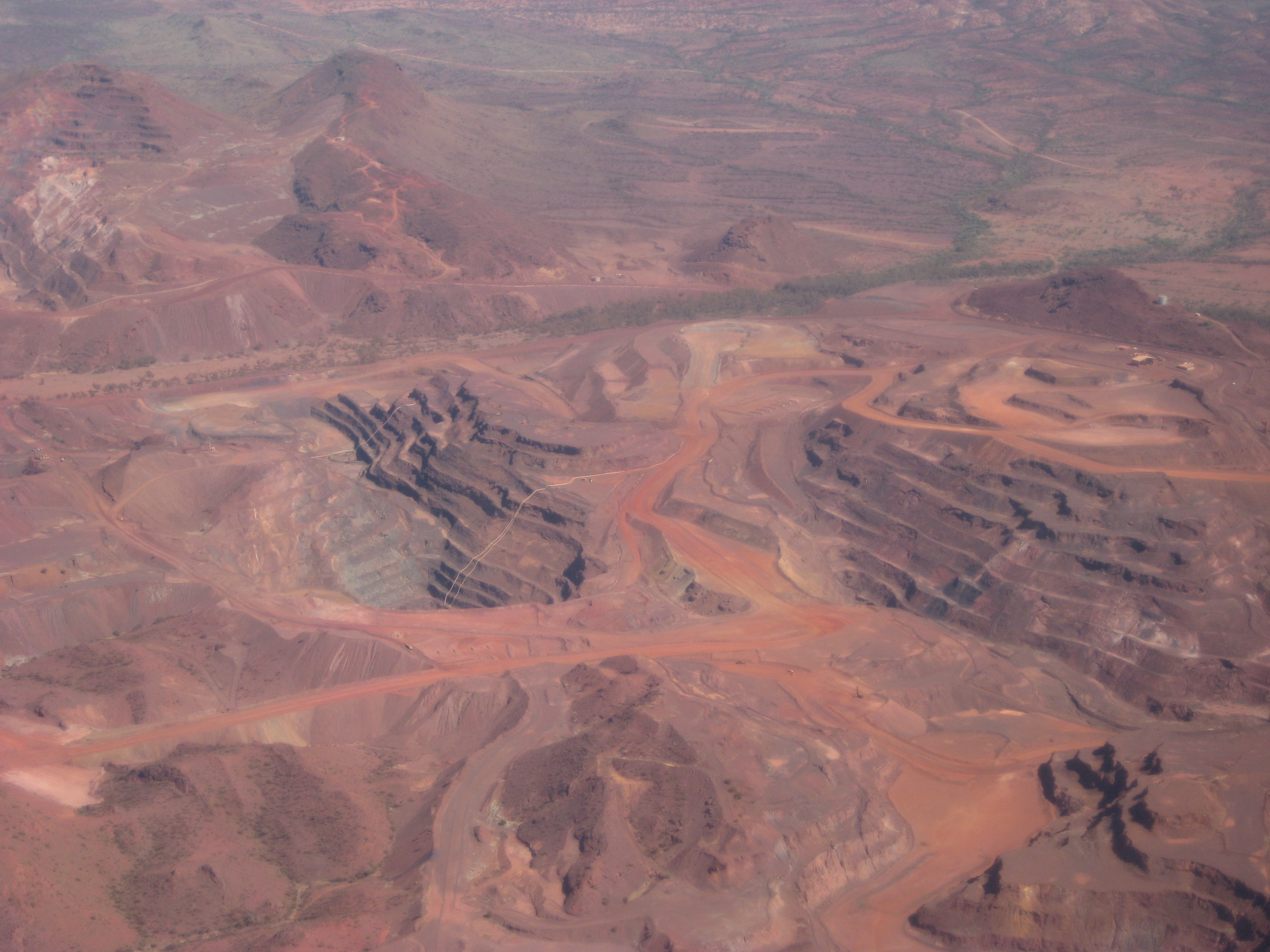
Paraburdoo mine aerial

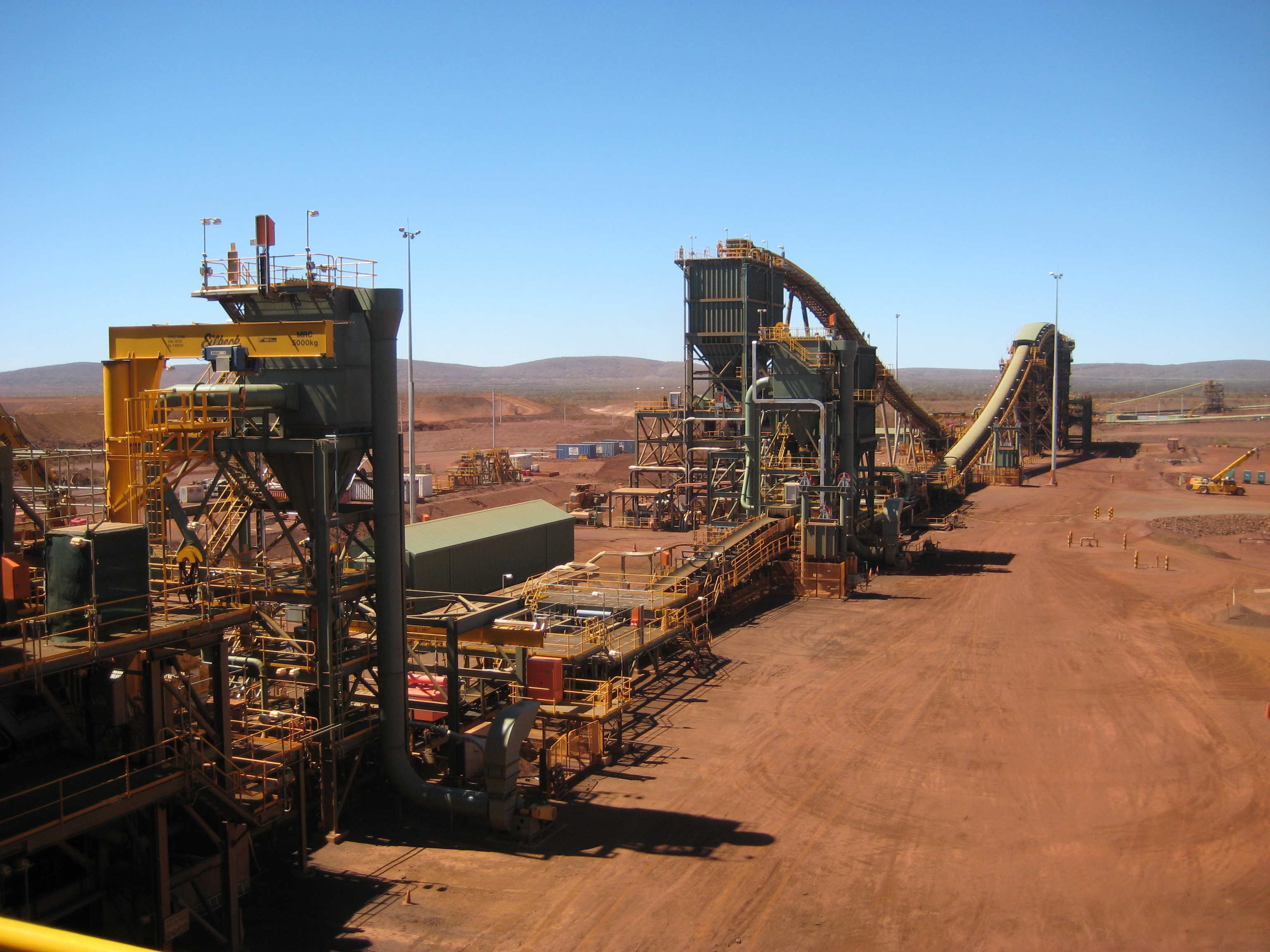
Plant, Brockman 4 mine

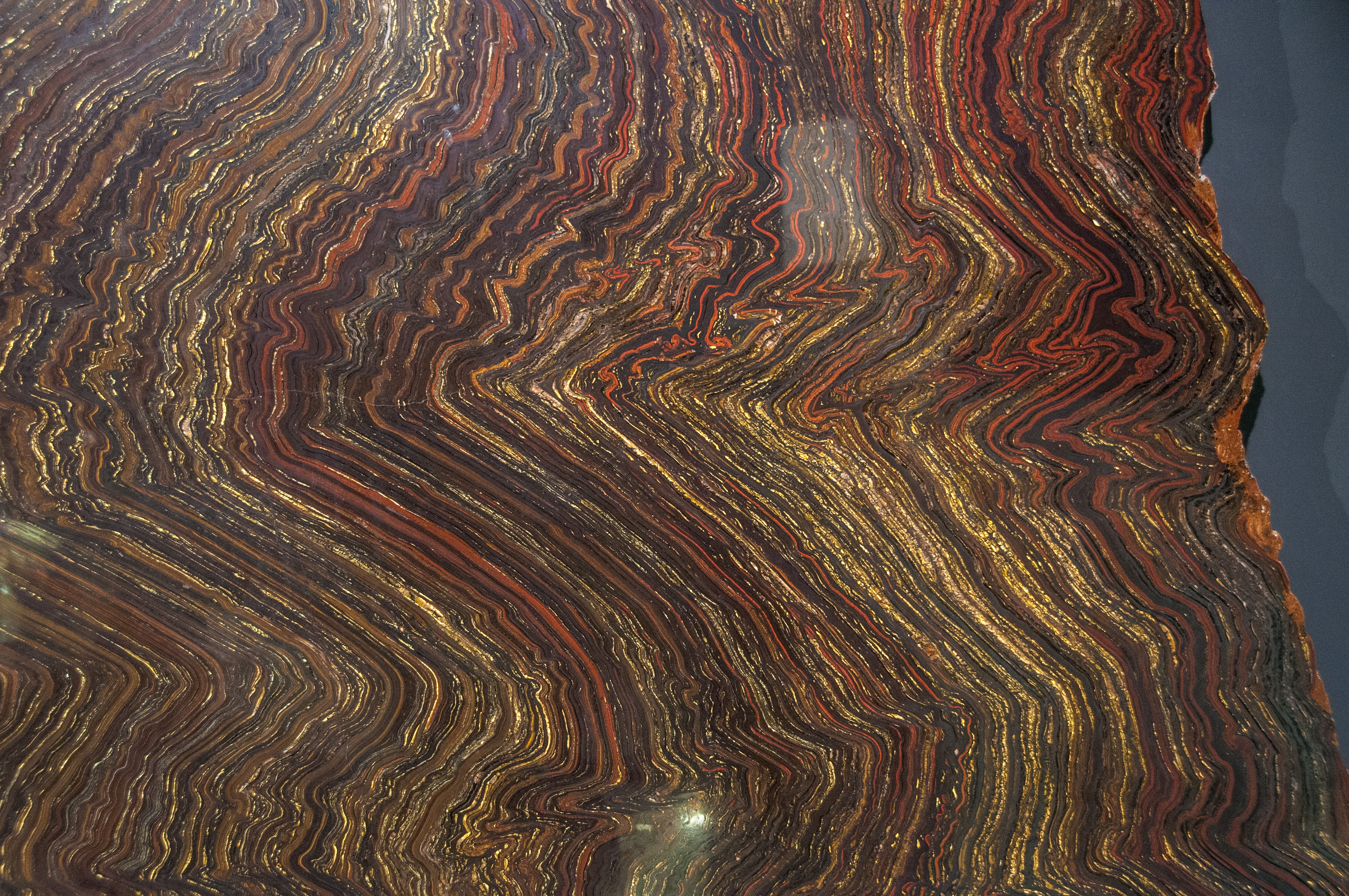
Jaspillite (banded iron formation) specimen from the Ord-Ridley Ranges, Pardoo, Pilbara

Most of Australia's iron ore is mined in the Pilbara, with mines mostly centred around Tom Price and Newman. The iron ore industry employs 9,000 people from the Pilbara area. The Pilbara also has one of the world's major manganese mines, Woodie Woodie, situated 400 kilometres (250 mi) southeast of Port Hedland.

Iron ore deposits were first discovered by prospector Stan Hilditch, who in 1957 found a large iron ore deposit in the southern Ophthalmia Range, at what was to become the Mount Whaleback mine.

In the 1960s, it was reportedly called "one of the most massive ore bodies in the world" by Thomas Price, then vice president of US-based steel company Kaiser Steel. Geoscience Australia calculated that the country's "economic demonstrated resources" of iron amounted to 24 gigatonnes, or 24 billion tonnes. According to the Australian Bureau of Agricultural and Resource Economics, as of 2010, that resource is being used up at a rate of 324 million tonnes a year, with rates expected to increase over coming years. Experts Gavin Mudd (Monash University) and Jonathon Law (CSIRO) expect it to be gone within 30 to 50 years (Mudd) and 56 years (Law).

As of 2010, active iron ore mines in the Pilbara are:

- BC Iron
  - Iron Valley mine
- BHP
  - Area C mine
  - Jimblebar mine
  - Mount Whaleback mine
  - Orebodies 18, 23 and 25 mine
  - Yandi mine
  - Yarrie mine
- Fortescue
  - Christmas Creek mine
  - Cloud Break mine
- Rio Tinto
  - Brockman mine
  - Brockman 4 mine
  - Channar mine
  - Eastern Range mine
  - Hope Downs mine
  - Marandoo mine
  - Mesa A mine
  - Mesa J mine
  - Mount Tom Price mine
  - Nammuldi mine
  - Paraburdoo mine
  - West Angelas mine
  - Yandicoogina mine
- Atlas Iron
  - Pardoo mine
- Moly Mines
  - Spinifex Ridge (molybdenum, copper, iron ore)

=== Liquified natural gas ===
A significant part of Pilbara's economy is based on liquified natural gas (LNG) through the North West Shelf Venture and Pluto LNG plant, both operated by Woodside.

Despite Woodside’s North West Shelf and Pluto Gas Plants recording record profits over the life of operations, Woodside’s agreements with Traditional Owners have been heavily criticised, given no royalties are provided to the Aboriginal community, and “gag clauses” are enforced through their agreements.

=== Agriculture ===
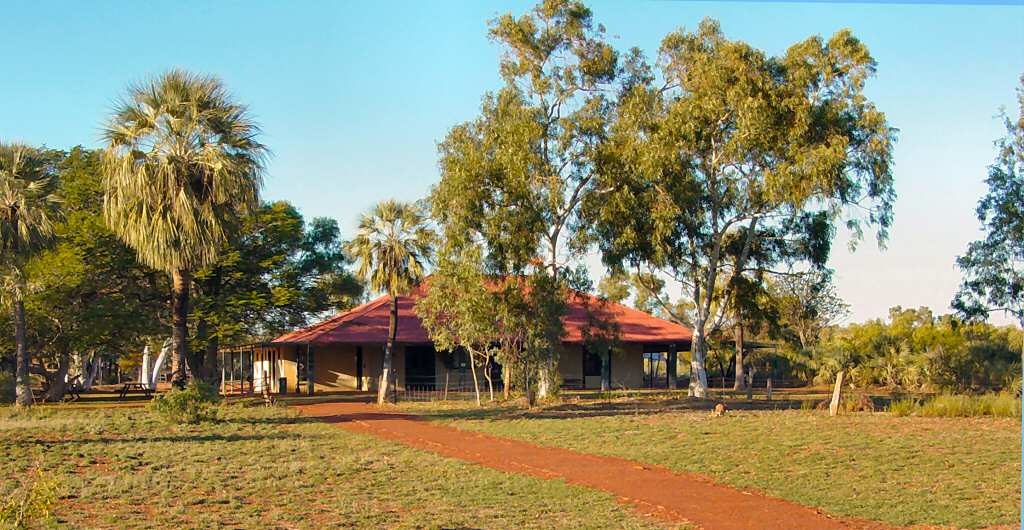
Millstream Homestead in Millstream-Chichester National Park

The region also has a number of cattle-grazing stations, and a substantial tourist sector, with popular natural attractions including the Karijini and Millstream-Chichester national parks and the Dampier Archipelago.

=== Transport ===
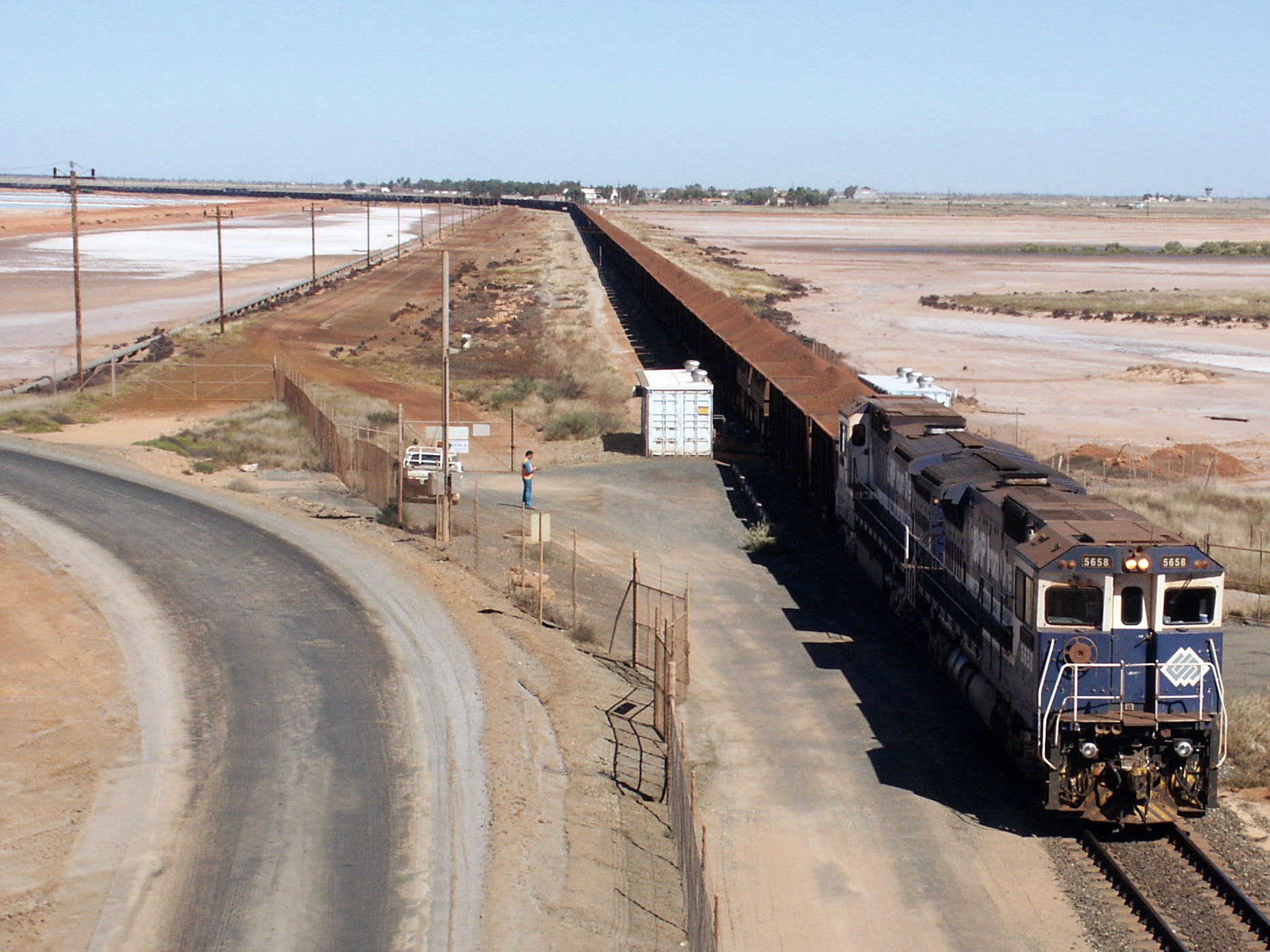
BHP iron ore train arriving at Port Hedland

The first railway in the Pilbara region was the narrow-gauge Marble Bar Railway between Port Hedland and Marble Bar. The Marble Bar Railway opened in July 1911 and closed in October 1951. The Roebourne-Cossack Tramway opened in 1897 and many industrial railways have been built to serve the mines.

Five heavy-duty railways are associated with the various iron-ore mines. They are all standard gauge and built to the heaviest North American standards. Rio Tinto runs driverless trains on its railways.

=== Ports ===
The ports of the Pilbara are:

- Port Hedland
  - Nelson Point and Finucane Island (operated by BHP)
  - Herb Elliott Port (operated by the Fortescue)
- Dampier (operated by Rio Tinto)
- Cape Lambert (operated by Rio Tinto)
- Anketell Port (under development)

=== Air transport ===
The region is served by these airports:

- Karratha Airport
- Newman Airport
- Paraburdoo Airport
- Port Hedland International Airport

== Ecology ==
=== Terrestrial ===
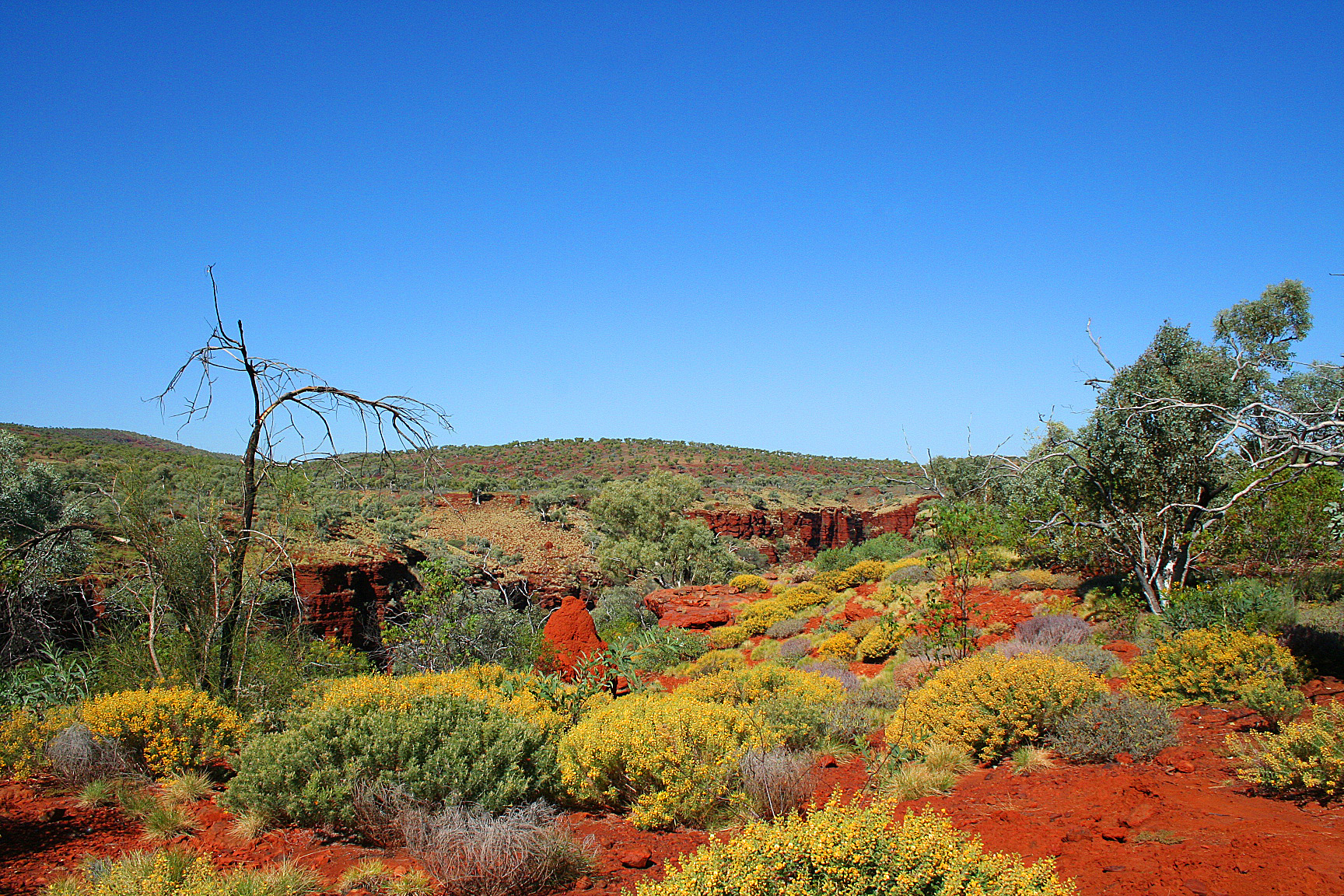
The vibrant colours of the outback in Karijini National Park

The dominant flora of the Pilbara is acacia trees and shrubs and drought-resistant Triodia spinifex grasses. Several species of acacia (wattle) trees are endemic to the Pilbara and are the focus of conservation programs, along with wildflowers and other local specialities.

"Fairy circles" (known as linyji in the Manyjilyjarra language and mingkirri in the Warlpiri language) which are circular patches of land barren of plants, varying between 2 and 12 metres (7 and 39 ft) in diameter and often encircled by a ring of stimulated growth of grass, are found in the western part of the Great Sandy Desert in the Pilbara. It has not yet been proven what causes these formations, but one theory suggests that they have been built and inhabited by Australian harvester termites since the Pleistocene.

The Pilbara is home to a wide variety of endemic species adapted to this tough environment. There is a high diversity of invertebrates, including hundreds of species of subterranean fauna (both stygofauna and troglofauna), which are microscopic invertebrates that live in caves, vugs or groundwater aquifers of the region, and terrestrial fauna (see short-range endemic invertebrates). The Pilbara olive python, the western pebble-mound mouse, and the Pilbara ningaui of the Hamersley Range are among the many species of animals within the fragile ecosystems of this desert ecoregion. Birds include the Australian hobby, nankeen kestrel, spotted harrier, mulga parrot and budgerigars.

Wildlife has been damaged by the extraction of iron, natural gas and asbestos, but the protection of culturally and environmentally sensitive areas of the Pilbara is now enhanced by the delineation of several protected areas, including the Millstream-Chichester and the Karijini National Parks.

=== Freshwater ===
The western Pilbara is part of the Pilbara freshwater ecoregion, also known as the Pilbara-Gascoyne or Indian Ocean drainage basin. The freshwater region is characterized by intermittent rivers which form deep gorges, and brackish-water caves that host endemic species. The region includes the drainages of the Murchison, Gascoyne, Ashburton, Fortescue, and De Grey rivers. The Great Sandy Desert, which covers the eastern Pilbara, has little freshwater habitat.

== See also ==
- Banded iron formation (BIF)
- North West Australia
- Pilbara Coast
- Pilbara historical timeline
- Pilbara newspapers
- Pilbara Railways
- Stromatolite

== General references ==
- "IBRA7: Pilbara Bioregion (PIL" (PDF).
- "IBRA7: Pilbara subregions (PIL01-PIL04" (PDF).
