= List of acts of the Parliament of Western Australia from 2025 =

This is a list of acts of the Parliament of Western Australia for the year 2025.

== 2025 ==
Short title, or popular name	Citation	Royal assent
Long title
Treasurer's Advance Authorisation Act 2025	No. 1 of 2025	30 April 2025
An Act to authorise expenditure in the financial year ending on 30 June 2025 to make certain payments or to make advances for certain purposes.
Architects Amendment Act 2025	No. 2 of 2025	10 June 2025
An Act to amend the Architects Act 2004 (Note: Architects Act 2004 (No. 75)) and to make consequential amendments to various written laws.
Salaries and Allowances Amendment Act 2025	No. 3 of 2025	19 June 2025
An Act to amend the Salaries and Allowances Act 1975 (Note: Salaries and Allowances Act 1975 (No. 27)) and to make a consequential amendment to the Constitution Acts Amendment Act 1899. (Note: Constitution Acts Amendment Act 1899 (63 Vict. No. 19))
Railway (Roy Hill Infrastructure Pty Ltd) Agreement Amendment Act 2025	No. 4 of 2025	19 June 2025
An Act to amend the Railway (Roy Hill Infrastructure Pty Ltd) Agreement Act 2010. (Note: Railway (Roy Hill Infrastructure Pty Ltd) Agreement Act 2010 (No. 43))
Duties Amendment Act 2025	No. 5 of 2025	19 June 2025
An Act to amend the Duties Act 2008. (Note: Duties Act 2008 (No. 11))
Conservation and Land Management Amendment Act 2025	No. 6 of 2025	24 June 2025
An Act to amend the Conservation and Land Management Act 1984. (Note: Conservation and Land Management Act 1984 (No. 126))
Mining Amendment (Transfer of Royalty Administration) Act 2025	No. 7 of 2025	2 July 2025
An Act to amend the Mining Act 1978 (Note: Mining Act 1978 (No. 107)) and the Taxation Administration Act 2003. (Note: Taxation Administration Act 2003 (No. 1))
Control of Vehicles (Off-road Areas) Amendment Act 2025	No. 8 of 2025	22 August 2025
An Act to amend the Control of Vehicles (Off-road Areas) Act 1978. (Note: Control of Vehicles (Off-road Areas) Act 1978 (No. 117))
Associations and Co-operatives Legislation Amendment Act 2025	No. 9 of 2025	22 August 2025
An Act to amend the Associations Incorporation Act 2015 (Note: Associations Incorporation Act 2015 (No. 30)) and the Co-operatives Act 2009. (Note: Co-operatives Act 2009 (No. 24))
Appropriation (Recurrent 2025-26) Act 2025	No. 10 of 2025	22 August 2025
An Act to grant supply and to appropriate and apply out of the Consolidated Account certain sums for the recurrent services and purposes of the year ending 30 June 2026.
Appropriation (Capital 2025-26) Act 2025	No. 11 of 2025	22 August 2025
An Act to grant supply and to appropriate and apply out of the Consolidated Account certain sums for the capital purposes of the year ending 30 June 2026.
Construction Industry Portable Paid Long Service Leave Amendment Act 2025	No. 12 of 2025	28 August 2025
An Act to amend the Construction Industry Portable Paid Long Service Leave Act 1985 (Note: Construction Industry Portable Paid Long Service Leave Act 1985 (No. 72)) and to make consequential amendments to the Building and Construction Industry Training Fund and Levy Collection Act 1990. (Note: Building and Construction Industry Training Fund and Levy Collection Act 1990 (No. 76))
Reserves Act 2025	No. 13 of 2025	25 September 2025
An Act—: to reserve land for the purposes of national parks, conservation parks and other purposes; and; to change the classification or purpose of certain reserves; and; to excise certain areas of land from reserves; and; to effect other changes to land; and; to amend the Reserves (National Parks, Conservation Parks, Nature Reserves and Other Reserves) Act 2004 (Note: Reserves (National Parks, Conservation Parks, Nature Reserves and Other Reserves) Act 2004 (No. 66)) consequentially.
Statutes (Repeals and Minor Amendments) Act 2025	No. 14 of 2025	25 September 2025
An Act to—: repeal various obsolete Acts; and; repeal various obsolete Imperial Acts or provisions of them in so far as they are part of the law of Western Australia; and; make minor amendments to various Acts.
Evidence Act 2025	No. 15 of 2025	25 September 2025
An Act—: to provide for the law of evidence; and; to repeal the Evidence Act 1906 and regulations made under that Act; and; to make consequential amendments to various Acts.
Petroleum Retailers Rights and Liabilities Repeal Act 2025	No. 16 of 2025	31 October 2025
An Act—: to repeal the Petroleum Retailers Rights and Liabilities Act 1982 (Note: Petroleum Retailers Rights and Liabilities Act 1982 (No. 105)) and regulations made under that Act; and; to make consequential amendments to the Petroleum Products Pricing Act 1983. (Note: Petroleum Products Pricing Act 1983 (No. 1))
Terrorism Legislation Amendment (Extension of Expiry) Act 2025	No. 17 of 2025	27 November 2025
An Act to amend the Terrorism (Extraordinary Powers) Act 2005 (Note: Terrorism (Extraordinary Powers) Act 2005 (No. 41)) and the Terrorism (Preventative Detention) Act 2006. (Note: Terrorism (Preventative Detention) Act 2006 (No. 42))
Charitable Collections Amendment Act 2025	No. 18 of 2025	4 December 2025
An Act to amend the Charitable Collections Act 1946. (Note: Charitable Collections Act 1946 (No. 29))
Assisted Reproductive Technology and Surrogacy Act 2025	No. 19 of 2025	18 December 2025
An Act—: about the provision of assisted reproductive technology services and arrangements for surrogacy and related matters; and; to establish the Assisted Reproductive Technology Advisory and Review Board; and; to repeal the Artificial Conception Act 1985, (Note: Artificial Conception Act 1985 (No. 14)) the Human Reproductive Technology Regulations 1993, (Note: Human Reproductive Technology Regulations 1993) the Surrogacy Act 2008 (Note: Surrogacy Act 2008 (No. 47)) and the Surrogacy Regulations 2009 (Note: Surrogacy Regulations 2009) and to revoke the Human Reproductive Technology Directions 2021 (Note: Human Reproductive Technology Directions 2021) and the Surrogacy Directions 2022; (Note: Surrogacy Directions 2022) and; to make consequential and related amendments to other Acts.
Liquor Control Amendment Act 2025	No. 20 of 2025	12 December 2025
An Act to amend the Liquor Control Act 1988 (Note: Liquor Control Act 1988 (No. 54)) and other Acts.
State Development Act 2025	No. 21 of 2025	19 December 2025
An Act—: to establish and make provision for the office of Coordinator General; and; to provide a framework for the coordination, facilitation and promotion of development and activities of strategic or economic significance to the State; and; to make related and consequential amendments to other Acts; and: for related purposes.
Help to Buy (Commonwealth Powers) Act 2025	No. 22 of 2025	19 December 2025
An Act—: to adopt specified versions of the Help to Buy Act 2024 (Commonwealth) (Note: Help to Buy Act 2024 (No. 124 (Cth))) as originally enacted and as subsequently amended by any amendments enacted by the Parliament of the Commonwealth from time to time before the day on which this Act comes into operation for the purposes of section 51(xxxvii) of the Constitution of the Commonwealth; and; to refer certain matters relating to the provision of Commonwealth financial assistance under a Help to Buy arrangement for the purpose of assisting individuals to buy a home to the Parliament of the Commonwealth for the purposes of section 51(xxxvii) of the Constitution of the Commonwealth; and; to make consequential amendments to—; the Duties Act 2008; and; the First Home Owner Grant Act 2000; (Note: First Home Owner Grant Act 2000 (No. 16)) and; the Keystart Act 2024; (Note: Keystart Act 2024 (No. 44)) and; the Land Tax Assessment Act 2002; (Note: Land Tax Assessment Act 2002 (No. 52)); and: for related purposes

== Sources ==
- "legislation.wa.gov.au".
