= Wabtec FLXDrive =

Class of battery-electric locomotives

Type and origin
- Power type: Battery-electric
- Builder: Wabtec/GE Transportation
- Build date: December 2019 - Present
- Total produced: 1 (18 on order)
Specifications
- Configuration
  - AAR: A1A-A1A
- Gauge: 4 ft 8 1/2 in (1,435 mm)
- Trucks: GE Hi-Ad
- Traction motors: GE GEB15
Performance figures
- Maximum speed: 75 mph (121 km/h)
- Power output: 4,400 hp (3,281.08 kW)
Career
- Operators: Union Pacific; Canadian National; Rio Tinto; BHP; Roy Hill
- Locale: United States; Canada; Australia

The Wabtec FLXDrive platform (pronounced "flex-drive") is a class of battery-electric locomotives manufactured by Wabtec's GE Transportation subsidiary beginning in 2019. Using a modified version of the GE Evolution Series platform, FLXdrive is Wabtec's first zero-emissions locomotive, storing energy in 20 racks of lithium-ion battery cells. FLXDrive is a hybrid-electric locomotive, meaning it works in conjunction with traditional diesel-electric locomotives to provide regenerative braking for a train. The first-generation locomotives (with a capacity of 2.4 MWh) are able to operate 30 to 40 minutes at full power when not connected to another locomotive.

The first prototype locomotive, number 3000, was successfully tested on BNSF Railway in 2021 and found to reduce fuel consumption when paired with conventional diesel-electric locomotives. Since 2020, FLXDrive locomotives have been ordered by Union Pacific, Canadian National, Rio Tinto, BHP, and Roy Hill. The first locomotives are scheduled to enter service in 2023.

In 2022, Wabtec announced a line of battery-electric locomotives including six-axle, four-axle, and foreign market variants. Wabtec plans to market the FLXDrive in tandem with hydrogen-powered locomotives, allowing the two types to complement each other.

On October 31, 2023, Wabtec unveiled the first production FLXDrive locomotive planned for delivery to the Australian Roy Hill ore railway in 2024. That unit, however, was never delivered and is now part of the test fleet.

BHP's locomotives arrived in Port Hedland in November 2025.

== Customers ==
Owner	Qty.	No.	Notes
GE Transportation	1	3000	
BHP	4	9001, 9002	2 initially, then 2 more to enter service in 2027
Canadian National	1	3700	
Rio Tinto	4	TBD	Trial cancelled
Roy Hill	1	2001	Never delivered, now GECX 2025
Union Pacific	4, reduced from 10	100-103	To be used exclusively in the Los Angeles Basin
Total	15		
