= Alstom Metropolis 98B =

Alstom electric multiple unit operated by the Warsaw Metro

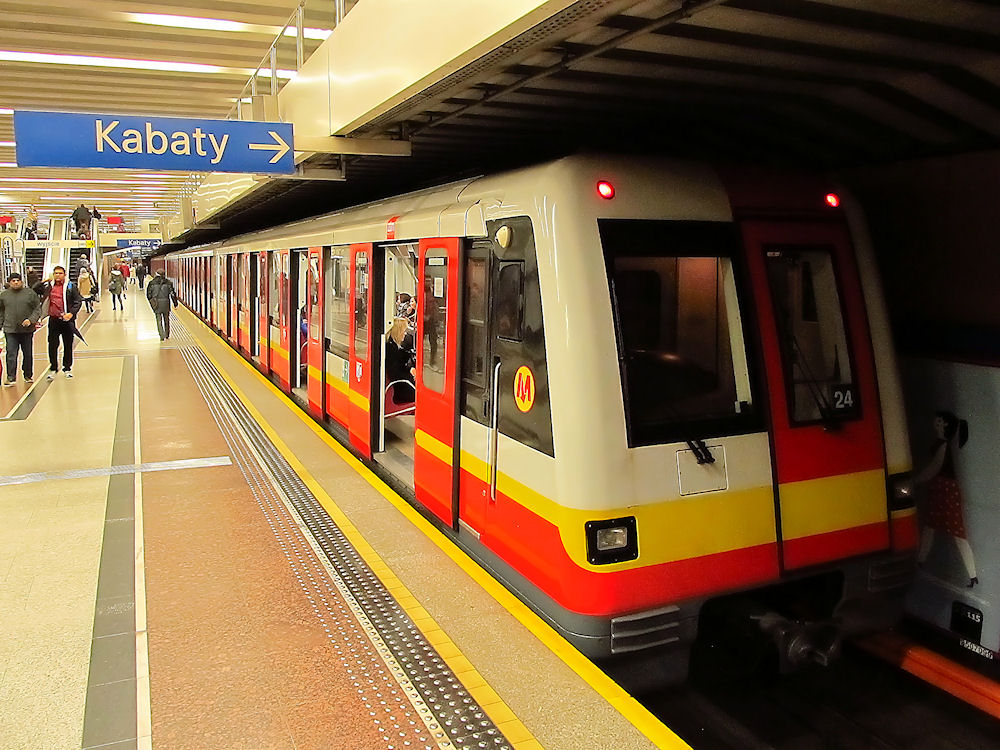
- Metropolis at the Wilanowska metro station
- Stock type: electric multiple unit
- In service: 2000–present
- Manufacturers: Alstom and Konstal
- Built at: Barcelona, Spain; Chorzów, Poland
- Family name: Metropolis
- Constructed: 2000–2002; 2004–2005
- Entered service: 30 September 2000
- Number built: 108 carriages (18 sets)
- Formation: 6-car sets; Tc–M–M–M–M–Tc
- Depot: Kabaty

Specifications
- Car body construction: Aluminium and steel
- Train length: 116.74 m (383 ft 0 in)
- Car length: Tc: 19.49 m (63 ft 11 in); M: 19.44 m (63 ft 9 in)
- Width: 2.72 m (8 ft 11 in)
- Height: 3.66 m (12 ft 0 in)
- Floor height: 1.15 m (3 ft 9 in)
- Wheel diameter: 860–790 mm (34–31 in) (new-worn)
- Wheelbase: 2 m (79 in)
- Maximum speed: 80 km/h (50 mph)
- Weight: 178.6 t (175.8 long tons; 196.9 short tons)
- Traction system: Alstom ONIX 800 IGBT–VVVF
- Traction motors: Alstom 4 EXA 2130 or EMIT STDa 280-4B asynchronous 3-phase AC
- Power output: 2,880 kW (3,860 hp) per entire train; 180 kW (240 hp) per motor
- Gear ratio: 6.94 : 1 (2-stage reduction)
- Electric systems: 750 V DC (nominal) from third rail
- Current collection: Contact shoe
- UIC classification: 2′2′+Bo′Bo′+Bo′Bo′+Bo′Bo′+Bo′Bo′+2′2′
- Wheels driven: 32 out of 48
- Braking systems: electrodynamic, pneumatic, mechanical
- Coupling system: Dellner
- Track gauge: 1,435 mm (4 ft 8 1/2 in) standard gauge

Alstom Metropolis 98B is an electric multiple unit produced by the French conglomerate Alstom and operated by the Warsaw Metro as their third-generation of rolling stock. Between 2000 and 2002, and again between 2004 and 2005, a total of 108 carriages were constructed at the manufacturer’s plants in Barcelona and Chorzów, forming 18 six-car trains.

== History ==
=== Origins ===
On 7 April 1995, the first section of the Warsaw Metro, M1, was opened. The 11 km (6.8 mi) long route connecting the Kabaty metro station with the Politechnika metro station was initially served by 14 three-car sets of the Russian Metrovagonmash 81-717/81-714. This rolling stock allowed trains to run at 5-minute intervals during peak hours and 7-minute intervals off-peak, with an eventual plan for five-car trains running at 90-second intervals.

In November 1997, a batch of 18 cars ordered from Russia arrived in Warsaw, allowing for the extension of trains to four cars and the assembly of a fifteenth set. On 26 May 1998, the existing section was extended to the Centrum metro station, and the new cars were put into operation.

Further plans included extending the line with another section and opening the Świętokrzyska and Ratusz Arsenał metro stations. An increase in passenger traffic was also anticipated. The Warsaw Metro decided to expand its rolling stock and announced a tender. Due to the outdated design of the used trains, new sets with modern construction meeting current requirements were ordered.

=== Tenders ===
From 1996 to 1998, three tenders for new rolling stock for the Warsaw Metro were announced, with the first two being unsuccessful.

On 15 July 1996, an open tender was announced. The specification was collected by 25 manufacturers, of which 8 submitted bids. On 7 March 1997, all bids were rejected, and the tender was canceled.

On 26 May 1997, a two-stage tender procedure began. The specification was collected by 16 manufacturers, of which 8 submitted initial bids. On 16 January 1998, after analyzing and rejecting 7 final bids, the second tender was also canceled.

On 9 February 1998, the Warsaw Metro announced a third tender for the delivery of 108 new cars to service M1 line. On 26 March 1998, the bids from 8 companies – Bombardier Transportation Polska, Construcciones y Auxiliar de Ferrocarriles, Daewoo, Bombardier Transportation, Alstom, Hyundai, Siemens Mobility, and Škoda Transportation – were opened, with prices ranging from 367 million PLN to 635 million PLN. Selection criteria included not only price but also the technical merits of the proposed rolling stock, the company's references, and the participation of domestic manufacturers in the delivery.

On 20 April 1998, it was announced that Alstom had won the tender with a bid of 479 million PLN. Siemens appealed the Warsaw Metro's tender commission decision, but the appeal was dismissed by the arbitration court of the Public Procurement Office. On 10 June 1998, Alstom was again declared the winner, and on 22 July 1998, a contract was signed with the company. The contract guaranteed the delivery of Metropolis 98B trains adapted to Polish requirements and the Soviet loading gauge used in the Warsaw Metro.

=== Production and deliveries ===
Year	Number of cars	Number of trains	Producer	Sources
2000	24	4	Alstom Transporte, Barcelona	
2001	24	4	Alstom Konstal, Chorzów	
2002	30	5	Alstom Konstal, Chorzów	
2004	18	3	Alstom Konstal, Chorzów	
2005	12	2	Alstom Konstal, Chorzów	

The first 4 Metropolis 98B trains were produced at Alstom’s plant in Barcelona in 2000.

On 24 July 2000, the first train arrived at the Port of Gdańsk from Barcelona by ship. It was unloaded from the ship’s hold using a floating crane and placed on the Vistula river wharf. The train was transported to Warsaw on its wheels. After connecting the inter-car couplers and air hoses, the train was coupled with specially prepared freight wagons on both sides. These wagons had a regular railway coupler on one end and an adapted metro coupler on the other. Then, a special freight train with additional empty gondola cars ensuring adequate braking mass was formed, as the metro cars lacked a pneumatic brake system meeting railway standards. The train departed in the evening, covering the route from Gdańsk to Warsaw at 60 km/h (37 mph). The subsequent three six-car trains, also produced in Spain, arrived in Poland the same way by October 2000.

The remaining 14 trains were built in Poland. As part of an offset agreement, the production of some components, final assembly, and painting were moved to Alstom Konstal’s plant in Chorzów, while the car bodies were assembled at Fablok’s plant in Chrzanów. Additionally, several domestic companies participated in the production, with the declared minimum share of the domestic industry at 55% (eventually reaching 60%).

On 6 March 2001, the first train was completed at the Alstom Konstal plant and presented in Chorzów. In the same year, 3 more trains were produced and delivered as planned.

In 2002, 5 more trains were built and delivered. However, in mid-2002, further deliveries were halted due to the ordering party’s financial problems and issues with the wheelsets of the delivered vehicles.

The original schedule planned for the last 5 trains to be delivered by 31 December 2004. Ultimately, only 3 trains were produced in 2004, delivered between October and December. In 2005, the last 2 trains were produced, with delivery occurring between April and May 2005, delayed by attempts to select wheels with better parameters.

The trains produced at the Alstom Konstal plant covered the 260 km (162 mi) route from Chorzów to Warsaw on their wheels, towed by an electric locomotive. Protective wagons were attached to the train to safeguard the Metropolis trains from potential damage during the journey. The train moved at 20 km/h (12 mph) to minimize the risk of damage during transport.

=== Testing ===
The trains produced in Spain underwent initial testing right after leaving the factory in Barcelona. After coupling the cars, static tests were conducted to refine and confirm the main static parameters of the train. Next, dynamic tests were carried out on a test track at a speed of 30 km/h (19 mph) to verify the performance of the propulsion and braking system. After transporting the trains to Warsaw, the main tests were conducted on the metro line to confirm the technical parameters of the cars. These included gauge tests, signal system compatibility, propulsion and braking tests, radio communication, and the automatic train protection (ATP) system.

The trains from Alstom Konstal’s plant were tested at the STP Kabaty in Warsaw upon arrival. Over a month, the trains underwent detailed gauge measurements, technical inspections by staff, manufacturer acceptance procedures, certification processes, and trial runs on the test track.

Between 2000 and 2001, certification tests for service operation were conducted, involving the manufacturer, the Tabor Railway Vehicle Institute from Poznań, the Institute of Transport of the Silesian University of Technology from Katowice, and AFK International from Warsaw. On 27 September 2000, the first four Metropolis 98B trains received a certificate of operation valid until 30 June 2002 from the Chief Railway Inspector. To obtain an indefinite certificate for the entire series, positive results from supervised operation before the certificate expired were required. On 29 May 2001, the indefinite certificate was issued.

== Construction ==
=== Technical data ===
	Tc car	M car	Entire train
Axle arrangement	2′2′	Bo′Bo′	2′2′+Bo′Bo′+Bo′Bo′+Bo′Bo′+Bo′Bo′+2′2′
Car arrangement	r	s	r+s+s+s+s+r
Service weight	28,1 t	30,6 t	178.6 t
Total length	19.49 m (63 ft 11 in)	19.44 m (63 ft 9 in)	116.74 m (383 ft 0 in)
Total width	2.72 m (8 ft 11 in)		
Total height	3.66 m (12 ft 0 in)		
Floor height	1,150 mm (45 in) above rail head		
Number of passenger doors per side	4		24
Passenger door width	1,300 mm (51 in)		
Number of seats (fixed+folding)	40 (36+4)	46 (44+2)	264 (248+16)
Number of standing places (6.7 people/m²)	189	203	1,190
Total number of places	229	249	1,454
Type of motors	—N/a	4 EXA 2130 (Barcelona-built cars) STDa 280-4B (Chorzów-built cars)	
Number and power of motors	—N/a	4×180 kW	16×180 kW
Voltage and power supply method	—N/a	750 V DC (nominal) from third rail	
Lifespan	25 years or 3 million km		
Sources			

=== Body ===
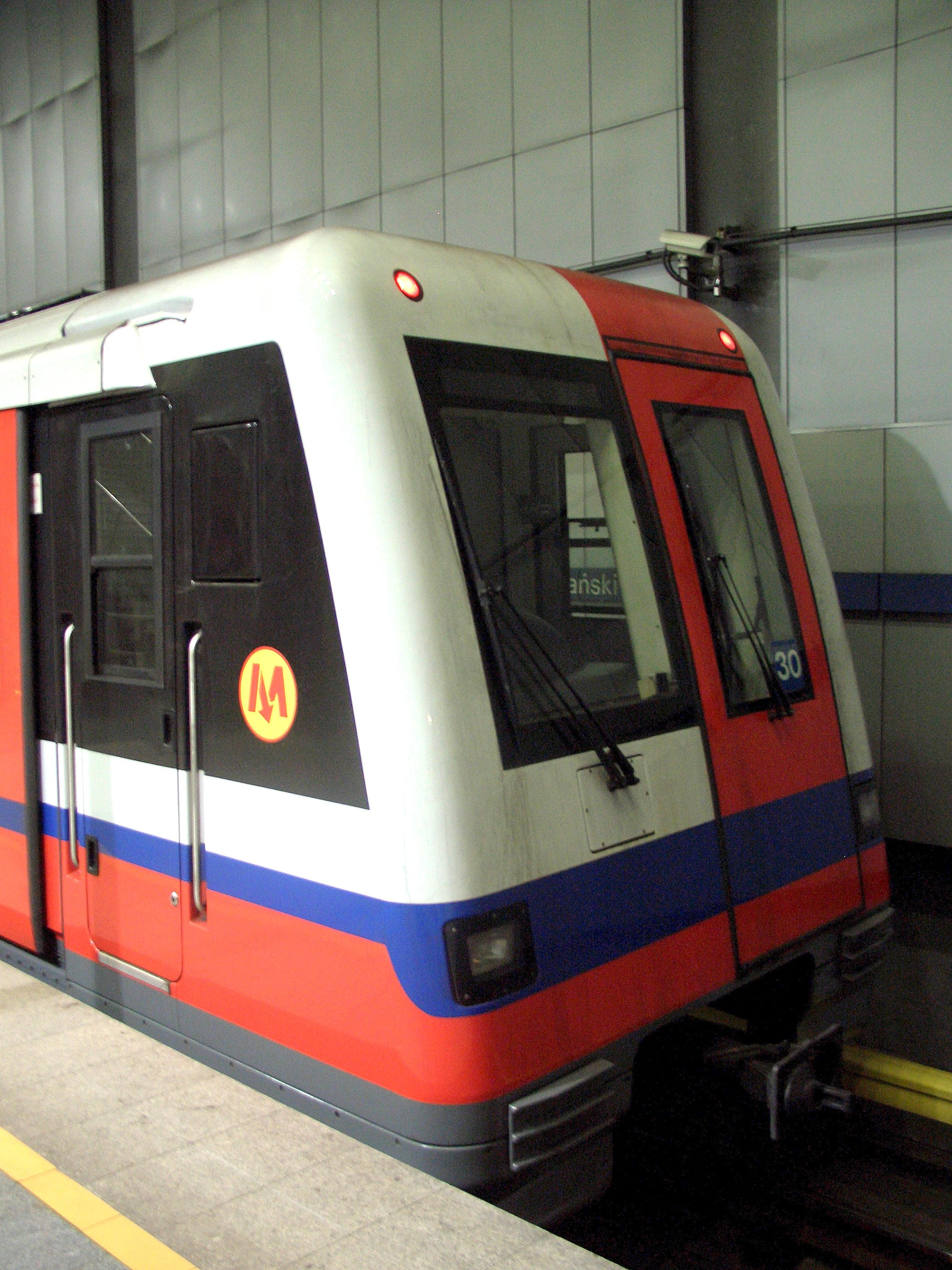
Front of the vehicle

The Alstom Metropolis 98B trains operated by Warsaw Metro feature two types of cars – end control cars designated as Tc and middle railcars designated as M. Trains are composed of six cars in the arrangement Tc+M+M+M+M+Tc and can only be operated as a whole unit; the number and arrangement of cars cannot be changed.

==== Body structure ====
The body construction is a combination of aluminum and steel, riveted in a manner that the rivets are not visible.

The main part of the Tc car body is made from pressed aluminum profiles. Two welded steel torsion bars connect the body to the bogie via the pivot pin. The rear welded steel end frame links the body frame to the coupling mount beam for connecting with other cars in the train set, and the welded steel cab module also allows for coupling at the front of the train. The rear part of the car contains a steel crumple zone.

The structure of the M car body is similar to the Tc car, with the cab module replaced by a rear section.

All side windows are fixed and mounted to the car body using elastomer profiles, ensuring tightness. The 8 mm (0.31 in) thick windows are made of tempered, shatterproof glass.

==== Couplers ====
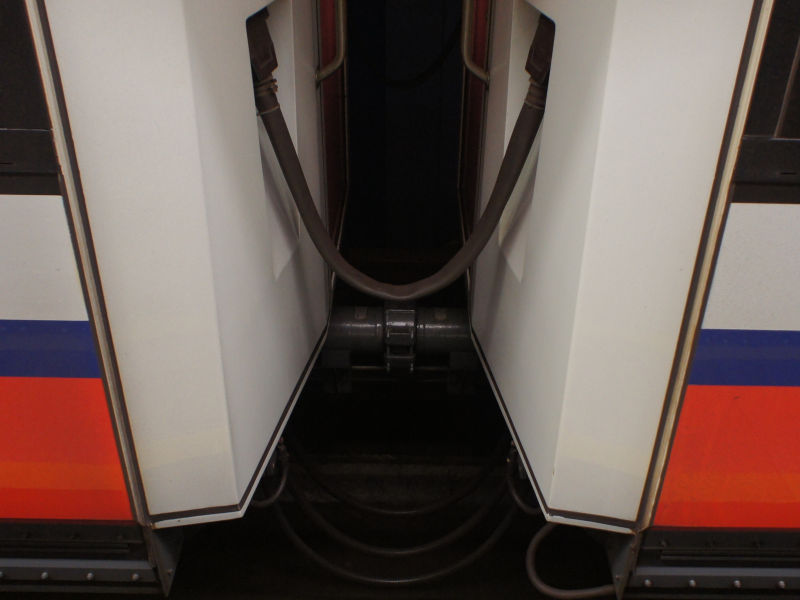
Semi-permanent inter-car coupler

Metropolis trains use two types of couplers – semi-automatic and semi-permanent. These were supplied by the Polish-Swedish company Dellner from Gdynia.

A semi-automatic coupler is installed at the front of the Tc car, allowing for mechanical connection of two vehicles without manual intervention, with manual uncoupling only. The primary components of the front coupler include a head permanently connected to the pin, a draw-and-buffer device, and centering spring cylinders. The coupler head and pin are connected to the draw-and-buffer device by a bolted clamp. Inside the draw-and-buffer device is an oil-gas shock absorber. The coupler is attached to the front end of the car by a joint and pin. Centering of the coupler is ensured by two spring cylinders located at the bottom. The coupler head design, specific to Warsaw Metro, enables emergency connections with series 81 cars. The axis distance of the coupler head from the rail head level is 829 mm (32.64 in).

Semi-permanent couplers are mounted at the rear of the Tc cars and at both ends of the M cars, connected by special clamps and bolts. Their height above the rail head level is 780 mm (30.71 in).

==== Passenger doors ====
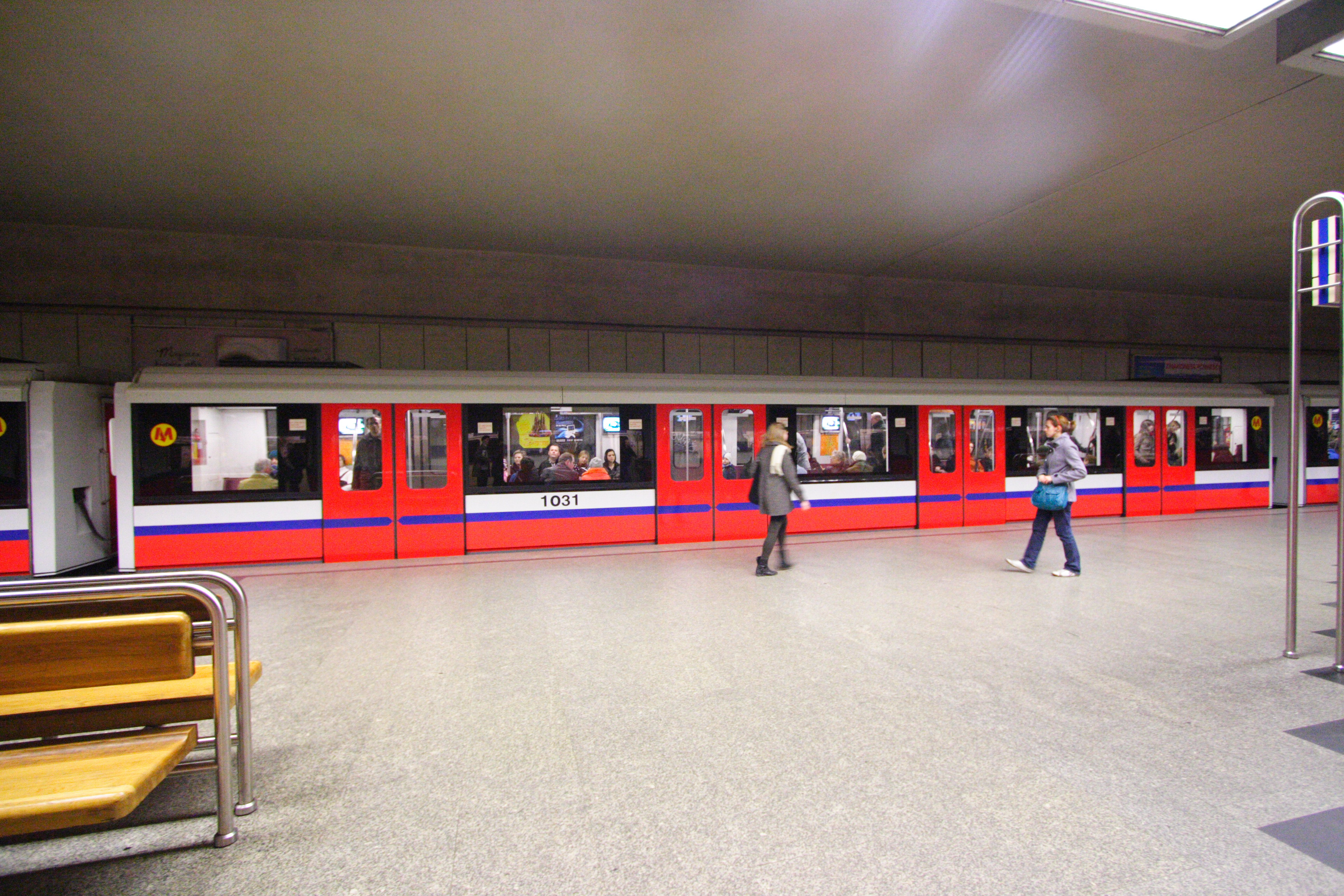
Four pairs of passenger doors on the side of the car

Each car is equipped with four pairs of 1.3 m (4 ft 3.18 in) wide sliding doors that move along tracks on the external walls. Door movement is powered by a DC electric motor. The inner surfaces of the doors are covered with polished stainless steel. In emergencies, each pair of doors can be manually unlocked by pulling down a special red lever. The upper part of each door panel is fitted with an 8 mm (0.31 in) thick tempered glass window.

==== Livery of Metropolis 98B trains (2000–2014) ====
Color	Name	Gloss	Application	Sources
	NCS S 1502-G	85% ±5	roof, upper part of the body	
	RAL 9017	85% ±5	window band	
	NCS S 4550-R80B	85% ±5	thin band in the middle of the body	
	NCS S 1085-Y90R	85% ±5	lower part of the body, doors	
	RAL 7012	50% ±5	underframe	

The car bodies are painted externally with polyurethane paints, with a declared durability of at least 5 years.

The livery design for Metropolis series vehicles was created in 1987 by artist Ryszard Bojar. The lower part of the car and doors are red, the upper part and roof are white, and there is a narrow navy blue stripe in between.

==== Livery of Metropolis 98B trains (post-2014) ====
Color	Name	Gloss	Application	Sources
	NCS S 1502-G	85% ±5	roof, upper part of the body	
	RAL 9017	85% ±5	window band	
	RAL 1003	85% ±5	thin band in the middle of the body	
	NCS S 1085-Y90R	85% ±5	lower part of the body, doors	
	RAL 7012	50% ±5	underframe	

In late October 2013, Warsaw Metro announced a tender for the major overhaul of Metropolis trainsets, which would include a change in the vehicle livery – the blue stripe was to be replaced with yellow film, and the front around the windows was to be repainted red. This was to unify the appearance of Alstom trains with the colors of other Warsaw Public Transport Authority vehicles. However, the tender was canceled, and in April and May 2014, the carrier announced two more competitions. The first was also canceled, and the second was resolved. At the end of July 2014, train no. 17 was the first to receive the new livery. The appearance of the next three Metropolis 98B trainsets was to be changed by 19 December 2014, but this deadline was not met.

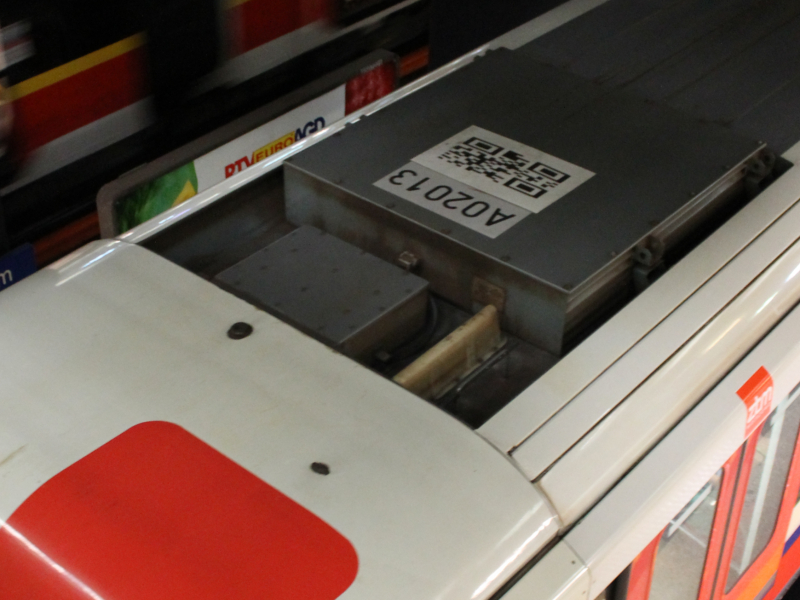
QR code on the roof of the train

In mid-2013, QR codes were added to the roofs of Warsaw Metro vehicles, including Alstom trainsets, for train inventory purposes at STP Kabaty.

=== Interior ===
The interior fittings were assembled without the use of screws. The interiors of the carriages are resistant to fire, scratches, graffiti, and detergents.

==== Passenger space ====
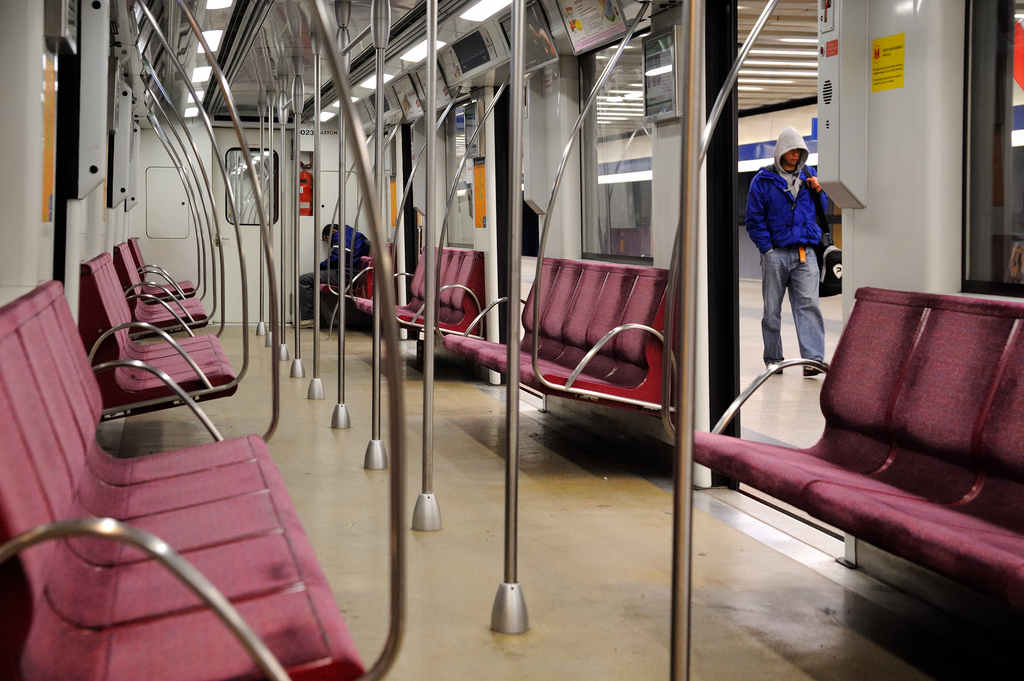
Metropolis train interior

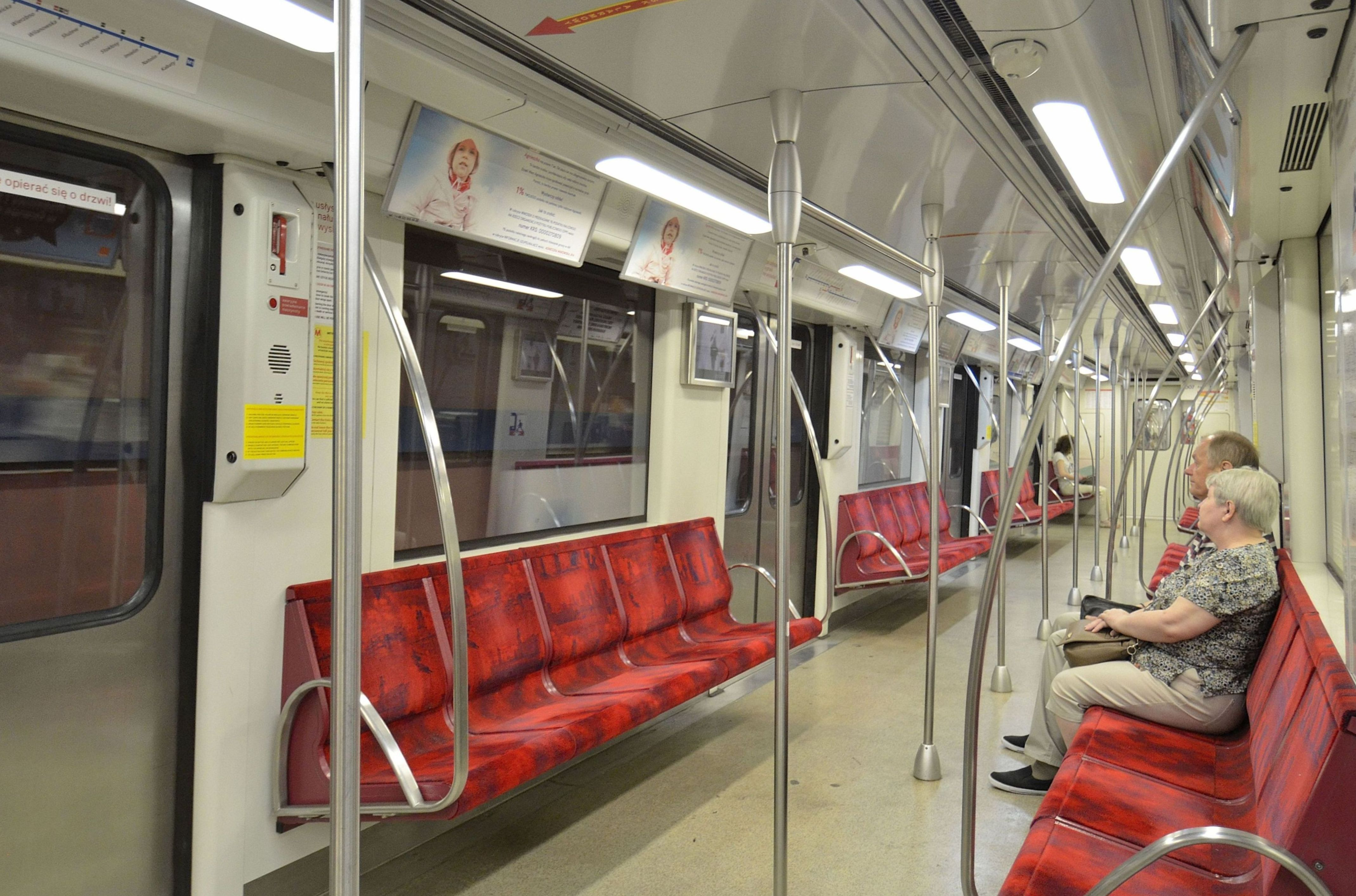
Metropolis train with a new upholstery design

The walls of the passenger compartment are covered with polycarbonate and aluminum panels. These panels are attached to the body shell using clips and double-sided adhesive tapes. The door drive covers, made of polyester, are locked with triangular key locks.

The carriages feature a longitudinal seating arrangement. The seats are directly attached to the walls, which was possible due to the absence of any train circuit components inside the passenger compartment. The seats, manufactured by Taps, have a design similar to those in Russian 81-series carriages. They are covered with vandal-resistant Nappe 2000 fabric, which includes fiberglass rod springs. Foldable seats are installed in areas designated for people with disabilities and strollers.

Swing doors located in the end walls of the carriages have a width of 750 mm (30 in). During normal operation, these doors are permanently closed and not intended for passenger use.

Handrails and poles are made of stainless steel. Handrails are mounted to the seats near each entrance door and under the ceiling, connected to vertical poles positioned along the axis of the carriage. This arrangement ensures stability for standing passengers almost anywhere in the carriage.

The floor surface is made of polyurethane resin with elastomer granules. Its pressure resistance is about 6.8 kN/m², and its durability is rated for at least 10 years of use.

Each carriage has six speakers through which information about the next stations is announced. LED displays are mounted on the end walls of the passenger compartment, providing information about the train's route and the next station.

The trains feature a passenger-driver communication system that allows passengers to verbally communicate with the driver by pressing a button near the entrance doors. This system operates in full-duplex mode.

In June 2013, a tender was announced to equip the Metropolis 98B trains with a monitoring system, which was completed in December 2013.

Passenger compartment lighting is provided by two rows of fluorescent fixtures located under the ceiling. Control carriages (Tc) have 16 fixtures of 36 W each, while motor carriages (M) have 18 fixtures. The lighting intensity, measured 800 mm above the floor and 600 mm from the seat backrest, is at least 150 lx. In case of power failure, only four fluorescent lamps, evenly distributed in the carriage and powered by emergency lighting batteries, are activated, providing 5 lx of light for at least 30 minutes.

Ventilation of the passenger compartment is ensured by two ventilation units mounted on the roof of each carriage. Filtered air is distributed through two channels located under the ceiling and introduced into the passenger compartment through special ventilation grilles. The efficiency of the ventilation system ensures an airflow of at least 7,900 m³/h per carriage with clean filters. The power supply system of the fan unit ensures normal ventilation for at least 30 minutes in case of a power outage. The forced ventilation system allows the use of non-opening windows in the passenger compartments.

The maximum noise level in the passenger compartment is 80 dB.

==== Driver's cabin ====
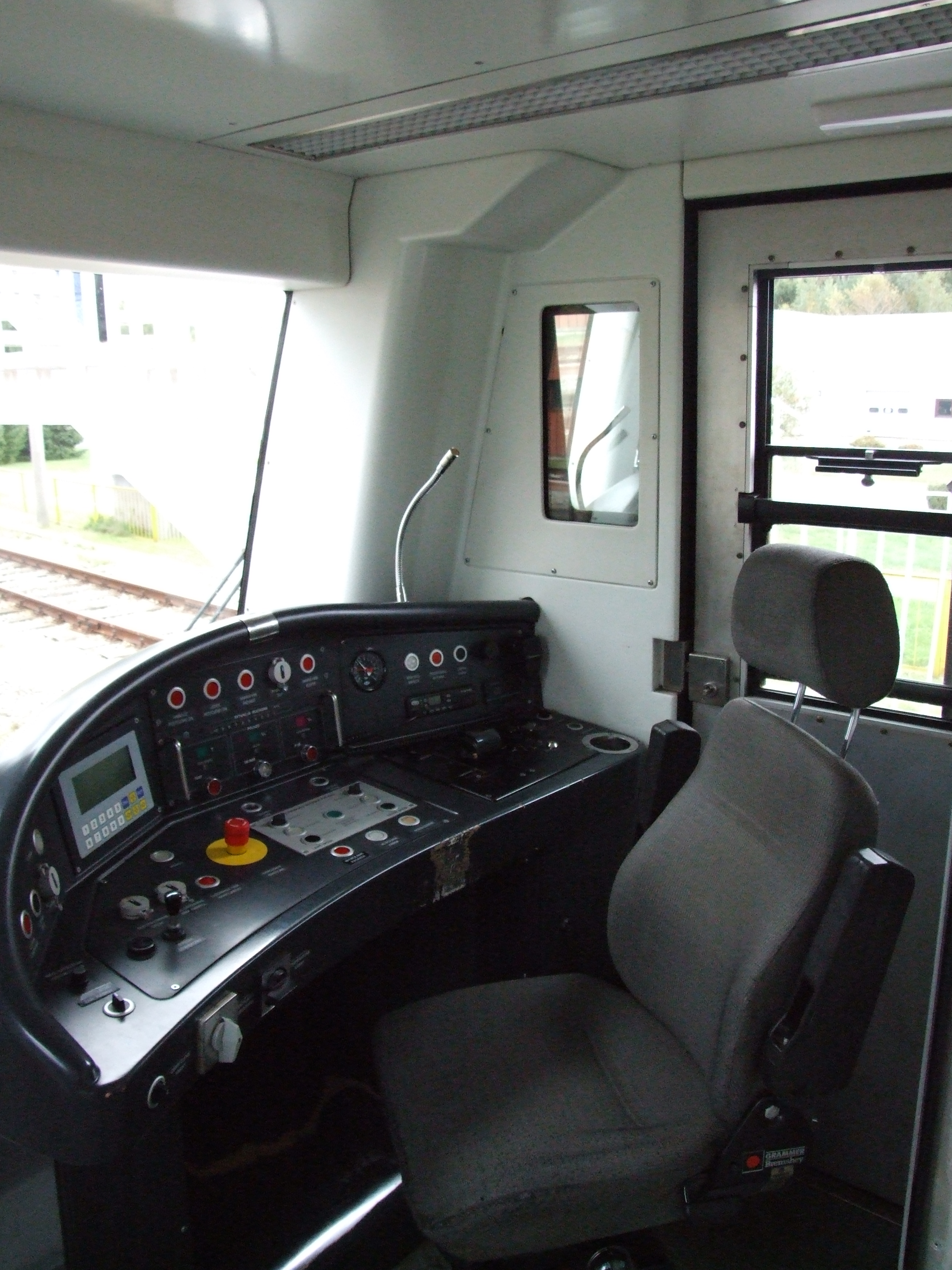
Driver's console

The driver's cabin has doors on each side for platform access. The rear wall of the cabin has a door to the passenger compartment. The front wall's left side has upward-opening emergency doors with dimensions of 922×2,121 mm, and the bottom edge is 1,400 mm above the rail head. These doors allow emergency egress from the driver's cabin, with a special aluminum ladder stored behind the driver's seat used for track access.

The front cabin window is made of shatterproof laminated glass reinforced with butyral plates. An electrically driven wiper and washer are located outside the front window, and a display showing the destination station is located at the top. This display is similar to those in the passenger compartment but with larger letters.

The adjustable driver's seat is on the right side of the carriage axis. In front of the seat is a console with necessary controls for safe and comfortable train operation. The left side of the cockpit has a COMET 1 console – a diagnostic system interface providing real-time information on train parameters, detected faults, and malfunctions. The right side of the console has a six-position driving mode selector and a sliding throttle with an active vigilance button in the handle. The cabin also contains an ATM event recording system.

Platform observation, in addition to mirrors and station monitors, is enabled by retractable external mirrors with pneumatic drives, operated from the console via buttons.

The driver's cabin lighting consists of two 36 W fluorescent fixtures mounted under the ceiling. The cabin can be heated with an electric heater and ventilated by electric fans.

The maximum noise level in the cabin is 70 dB.

=== Bogies ===
	Motorised bogie	Trailing bogie
Track gauge	1,435 mm (4 ft 8 1/2 in)	
Number of axles	2	
Wheelbase	2 m (6 ft 7 in)	
Maximum axle load	127.5 kN	
Wheel diameter new–worn	860–790 mm (34–31 in)	
Wheel profile	28 UIC-135	
Lower clearance	50 mm	
Number of brake discs	1	2
Number of traction motors	2	—N/a
Number of gearboxes	2	—N/a
Number of contact shoes	2	—N/a
Maximum speed	90 km/h	
Weight without traction motors	5,743 kg	5,178 kg
Sources		

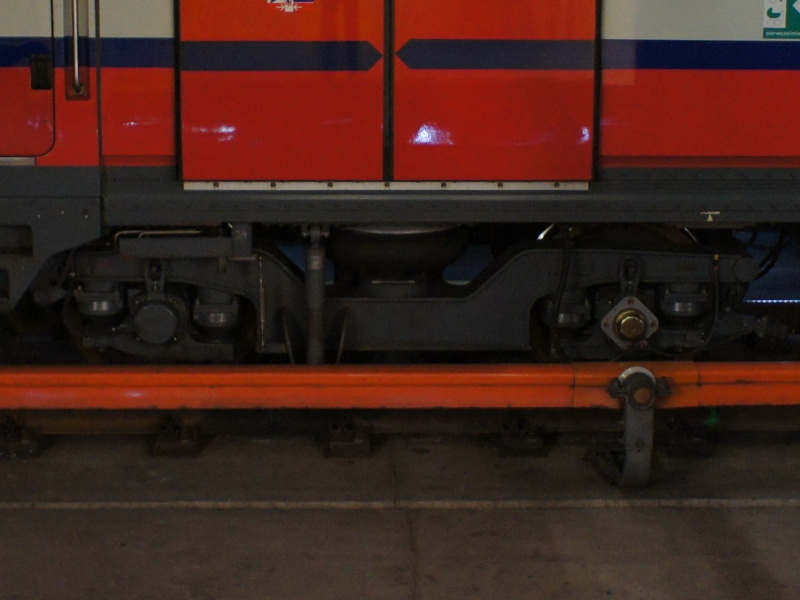
Trailing bogie

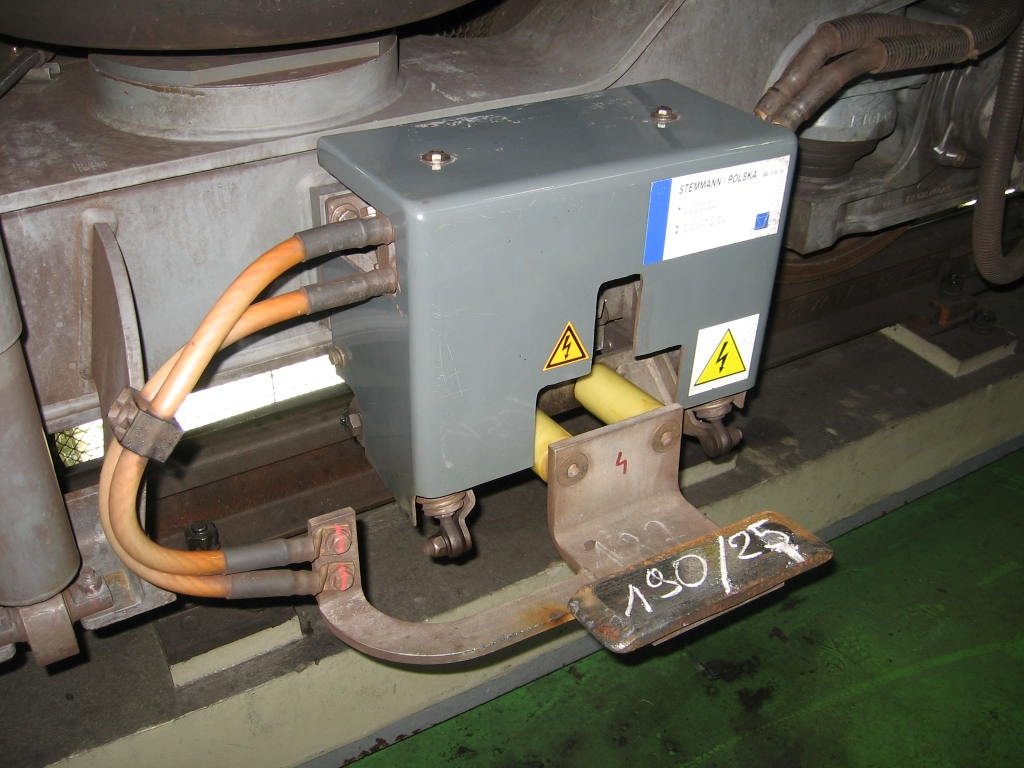
Current collector on a motorised bogie

Each carriage is supported by two two-axle bogies. End control carriages are mounted on trailing bogies, while middle motor carriages are on motorised bogies.

The bogie frame is a closed dual-circuit spatial structure. It is supported on rubber-metal conical spring blocks mounted on the axle bearing consoles, serving as the first stage suspension. Air springs are installed on recessed parts of the side frame beams, forming the second stage suspension, with the body suspended on them. Vertical hydraulic dampers connect the body frame with the side frame beams. Longitudinal forces are transmitted from the bogie to the body through a pivot pin mounted in the body frame. The lower end of the pin is seated in a cross member socket of the bogie frame, with rubber packages allowing lateral flexible movement of the bogie relative to the body. A hydraulic damper connects the cross member of the bogie to the body. The primary braking system is electrodynamic, with disc brakes serving as secondary brakes. Weight valves maintain a constant floor height regardless of load. Wheels have a 28 UIC-135 profile.

In the motorised bogie, two traction motors are suspended unilaterally in the cross member frame, with gearboxes bearing on the axles and hung from the cross member (tram system). Motors are part of the sprung mass, with resilient couplings connecting their shafts to the gear shafts. Current collectors from the third rail are resiliently mounted to the outer sides of the side frame beams. Due to space constraints on the driven axles, single discs are mounted, with actuators and brake shoes suspended from tubular front beams of the frame.

The trailing bogie lacks traction motors and current collectors, with two brake discs on the wheelset axles independently operated by actuators mounted similarly to those in the motorised bogie.

=== Drive system ===
==== Traction motors ====
	4 EXA 2130	STDa 280-4B
Manufacturer	Alstom Transport	EMIT Żychlin
Motor type	Asynchronous 3-phase AC	
Nominal phase/line voltage (motoring)	290 V / 500 V	
Nominal phase/line voltage (regenerative)	320 V / 550 V	
Frequency	63 Hz	
Shaft power	180 kW (240 hp)	
Phase current	259 A	257 A
Shaft speed	1,839 rpm	1,854 rpm
Motor torque	900 Nm	927 Nm
Max torque (motoring)	1,470 Nm	
Max torque (braking)	1,290 Nm	
Efficiency	~94%	
Temperature rise	120 °C	-
Insulation class	200	
Weight	630 kg	589 kg
Tunnel operating temperature range	+5 to +30 °C	
Surface operating temperature range	-35 to +40 °C	
Relative humidity in tunnel	up to 80% at 25 °C	
Sources		

The train's drive system consists of independent systems for each powered car M. Each drive system is assigned to each bogie.

Under each of the middle M cars, there is a power inverter box housing two ONIX 800 traction inverters, drive control electronics, and the basic components of the main inverter circuit such as an input filter with choke, over-voltage protection system, keys consisting of three IGBT modules connected in parallel, braking chopper, quick switch control module, sensors and protective relays, input and capacitor charging contactors, workshop switch, and a cooling fan with its control. Each inverter powers two traction motors connected in parallel, and each traction motor drives one axle of the M car. Due to the need for a high gear ratio between the motor and the wheels, two-stage gearboxes were necessary.

The drive control uses the AGATE system (Advanced GEC ALSTHOM Traction Electronics), which operates in a 32-bit system. The system is based on a multiprocessor structure using microprocessors for general use, monitoring functions, fast calculations, and power control. The system receives signals from the SOP-2 system, data on the weight of the cars, door closure and locking, door bypassing, and wheel slip or skidding during startup, in addition to signals from the travel controller encoder.

The Alstom Metropolis 98B vehicles operated by Warsaw Metro use two models of induction motors – the 4 EXA 2130 produced by the French company Alstom in the cars built in Spain and the STDa 280-4B produced by the Polish EMIT Żychlin plant in the cars built in Poland. They are compatible with each other.

==== 4 EXA 2130 motor ====
The 4 EXA 2130 traction motor is mounted centrally on the bogie using three pivots. Two are positioned so that their horizontal axes are on the upper side of the central part of the bogie, bearing vertical, transverse, and longitudinal loads. The third pivot, with a vertical axis, is mounted in the lower central part of the bogie, bearing part of the longitudinal load and the reaction force from the torque.

The motor housing, made of steel sheets, is fully welded.

The stator winding consists of diamond-shaped coils wound with flat copper wire. The rotor winding is built from a laminated sheet package, mounted hot on the shaft, and clamped between two end plates.

The rotor shaft is made of high-strength alloy steel. At the drive end of the shaft, there is a gear coupling connected to the gearbox hydraulically pressed, and an auxiliary fan; the main fan is mounted on the opposite end.

The main fan, a centrifugal type, is mounted externally to the motor frame. It directs airflow to the heat exchange channels on the outer perimeter of the magnetic circuit, with its externally toothed turbine serving as a speed sensor disk. The internal fan, mounted inside, forces internal air circulation, balancing temperature differences within the motor.

The motor bearing covers are made of malleable cast iron. At the non-drive end, the cover functions as an air flow diffuser from the fan and supports the bearing, allowing the installation of a speed sensor. The drive end cover is ribbed, providing greater mechanical stiffness and improved heat exchange with the external cooling airflow.

Electrical connections are made through wires internally connected to insulators, routed to a junction box mounted on the upper part of the motor.

==== STDa 280-4B motor ====
The STDa 280-4B traction motor is a four-pole, three-phase asynchronous motor with an integrated ventilator. The squirrel-cage rotor has a bar construction. The motor housing has an IP22 protection rating according to PN-EN 60034-5.

The frame, made of a package of magnetic sheets, is a welded construction.

The stator winding, with a 200 insulation class, consists of regulated coils wound with flat copper wire. The rotor winding is built from laminated sheets, hot-mounted on the shaft, and clamped between two pressing rings.

The rotor shaft is made of high-strength alloy steel. The shaft features a fan that forces cooling air through axial channels in the rotor and stator sheet package. The drive-end journal is designed for mounting a gear coupling connected to the gearbox, while the non-drive end features a speed sensor disk.

The bearing discs, made of spheroidal cast iron, are set in slots and bolted to the frame. The non-drive end disc acts as an air flow diffuser from the fan, supports the bearing, and allows the installation of a speed sensor. The drive end cover is ribbed for increased mechanical stiffness and improved heat exchange with the external cooling airflow.

The motor's power supply cables are connected to terminals in a terminal box bolted to the frame.

=== Auxiliary circuits ===
Each end car Tc is equipped with a static voltage converter. The device uses IGBT transistors and consists of a single-phase inverter, transformer, diode rectifier, and output filter. The input circuits of the converter feature an LC input filter to protect the device from transients and a low-pass filter to prevent higher harmonics from passing into the supply lines. The voltage on the filters is monitored, and the output signal from the meter is used by the converter control system to start it. The auxiliary converter is powered by a DC third rail voltage ranging from 500 to 1000 V and has two outputs – 110 V DC and 400 V 50 Hz three-phase AC. The 110 V DC supplies battery charging, passenger compartment fans, emergency lighting in passenger compartments, train exterior lighting, passenger door drive motors, electronic control devices, passenger-driver communication devices, radio, train protection devices, and other driver's cab equipment. The 400 V 50 Hz AC supplies compressors, heaters and fans in the driver's cabs, brake resistor fans, ONIX box fans, and fans for chokes and auxiliary converters.

Under the body of each cab car Tc, there is a maintenance-free nickel-cadmium battery with a capacity of 90 Ah, housed in a ventilated box mounted to the chassis. Battery maintenance involves checking and replenishing the electrolyte.

=== Pneumatic system ===
The source of compressed air in the train are two SL 20-5-66 rotary-screw compressors, each mounted under the body of a cab car Tc and driven by an 11 kW three-phase AC motor.

During train operation, only one compressor in the last car is activated, fully meeting the compressed air demand. In case of failure and pressure drop below 7.5 bar, the second compressor is engaged. Normally, the devices operate in the pressure range of 8.5 to 10 bar. Each compressor is protected by a safety valve set at 11 bar.

The unit is equipped with a compressed air cooler, a dual-chamber alternating desiccant dryer, and a fine particulate filter. It is suspended to the body via a frame, forming an easily detachable module.

In emergency situations or during maintenance and repair, the system can be supplied with compressed air from an external source through couplings in the front-end connectors.

=== Brake system ===
The primary service brake is an electrodynamic brake using traction motors as generators during braking. It is supported by an air brake at low and high speeds. Energy dissipation occurs through recuperation into the power supply network, or in the absence of a receiver, by conversion to heat in resistors. If the desired deceleration cannot be achieved by the electrodynamic brake (maximum 1.3 m/s²), the pneumatic brake supplements the braking force, first on the powered bogies and then on the trailing bogies. The service brake algorithm allows for immediate replacement of the electrodynamic brake with the pneumatic brake in the event of a failure, allowing train operation with a faulty electrodynamic brake at a reduced maximum speed of 57 km/h.

The emergency brake is a pneumatic brake activated by an electric signal, operating until the train stops. The maximum emergency braking deceleration is 1.4 m/s², which can only be reduced by commands from the anti-slip system.

The parking brake is a mechanical brake acting on one axle of each bogie, capable of holding a stationary train on a 45‰ incline. The brake is released automatically by applying pressure to the main pipe, or manually in the absence of pressure.

The holding brake takes over the parking brake's role after the train stops and pressure is present in the main pipe, preventing the train from rolling. Additionally, the holding brake is associated with the service braking process at speeds below 10 km/h and the starting system, preventing sudden changes in deceleration or acceleration experienced by passengers as jerks.

The holding brake operates through a pneumatic system in a separate mode from service braking. After stopping, pressure is automatically maintained in the cylinders. The brake is released by moving the travel controller lever to the start position or selecting shunting mode.

The braking resistors are constructed from stainless steel elements connected in series-parallel. Two resistors are housed in a common casing and mounted to the underframe of each powered car M. The resistors are cooled by fans powered by auxiliary circuits from the 400 V 50 Hz three-phase network. The resistors are designed to operate in humid and contaminated environments.

=== Safety ===
The construction of the trains meets current safety standards and fire regulations. The car bodies were tested in a specialized laboratory in Belgium, and the materials used in their construction comply with Polish standards in terms of flammability, toxicity, and smoke emission. Each car is equipped with powder fire extinguishers, and temperature sensors are installed in the electrical equipment boxes located under the undercarriage.

Almost all repair work is carried out without high-voltage power to the train, and if necessary, a workshop switch is used. Its design prevents high voltage from being applied to the current collectors when the train is in the depot. Setting the switch to neutral immediately discharges the capacitors.

The SOP-2 system guarantees train traffic safety. The Speed Limitation System continuously monitors the difference between the train's speed and the allowable speed. If the speed exceeds the limit by more than 2 km/h, the system automatically applies service braking. If, for unknown reasons, the train does not start service braking, emergency braking will be activated after 5 seconds, which cannot be interrupted by the driver until the vehicle comes to a complete stop. The design of the Metropolis trains includes additional functions of this system such as automatic reversing, remote train removal from tunnels, and targeted driving, but these are not utilized.

=== Maintenance and repair cycle ===
Maintenance level	Type of inspection or repair	Distance	Time corresponding to distance	Sources
P1	PK – control inspection	–	2 weeks	
P2	PO – periodic inspection	23,750 – 26,250 km	3 months	
P3	PD – extended periodic inspection	95,000 – 105,000 km	1 year	
P4.1	R1 – first revision repair	190,000 – 210,000 km	2 years	
P4.2	R2 – second revision repair	380,000 – 420,000 km	4 years	
P4.3	R3 – third revision repair	760,000 – 840,000 km	8 years	
P5	G – major repair	1,520,000 – 1,680,000 km	16 years	

Metropolis cars, although equipped with onboard diagnostic devices, are maintained according to a rigid and formalized cycle that treats the vehicle as a whole. There are two standards – mileage in kilometers and time, which determines whether an inspection or repair is due if the vehicle has not traveled the normative number of kilometers.

The diagnostic system installed in Alstom trains affects the scope of repair work when an abnormality in the operation of any component is detected. Components that are operating correctly are subject to the rigor of the cycle and regulations regarding the work to be done during inspections and repairs.

== Operation ==
=== Composition of trains ===
Train set number	Warsaw Metro train number	Side cars numbers (Tc1 + M1 + M2 + M3 + M4 + Tc2)	Start of operation	Sources
1	16	2001 + 1001 + 1002 + 1003 + 1004 + 2002	30 September 2000	
2	17	2003 + 1005 + 1006 + 1007 + 1008 + 2004	30 September 2000	
3	18	2005 + 1009 + 1010 + 1011 + 1012 + 2006	30 September 2000	
4	19	2007 + 1013 + 1014 + 1015 + 1016 + 2008	30 September 2000	
5	20	2009 + 1017 + 1018 + 1019 + 1020 + 2010	18 May 2001	
6	21	2011 + 1021 + 1022 + 1023 + 1024 + 2012	28 June 2001	
7	22	2013 + 1025 + 1026 + 1027 + 1028 + 2014	30 June 2001	
8	23	2015 + 1029 + 1030 + 1031 + 1032 + 2016	30 June 2001	
9	24	2017 + 1033 + 1034 + 1035 + 1036 + 2018	8 October 2002	
10	25	2019 + 1037 + 1038 + 1039 + 1040 + 2020	13 December 2002	
11	26	2021 + 1041 + 1042 + 1043 + 1044 + 2022	26 November 2002	
12	27	2023 + 1045 + 1046 + 1047 + 1048 + 2024	18 December 2002	
13	28	2025 + 1049 + 1050 + 1051 + 1052 + 2026	31 December 2002	
14	29	2027 + 1053 + 1054 + 1055 + 1056 + 2028	28 October 2004	
15	30	2029 + 1057 + 1058 + 1059 + 1060 + 2030	3 December 2004	
16	31	2031 + 1061 + 1062 + 1063 + 1064 + 2032	30 December 2004	
17	32	2033 + 1065 + 1066 + 1067 + 1068 + 2034	12 May 2005	
18	33	2035 + 1069 + 1070 + 1071 + 1072 + 2036	30 May 2005	

=== M1 line in Warsaw ===
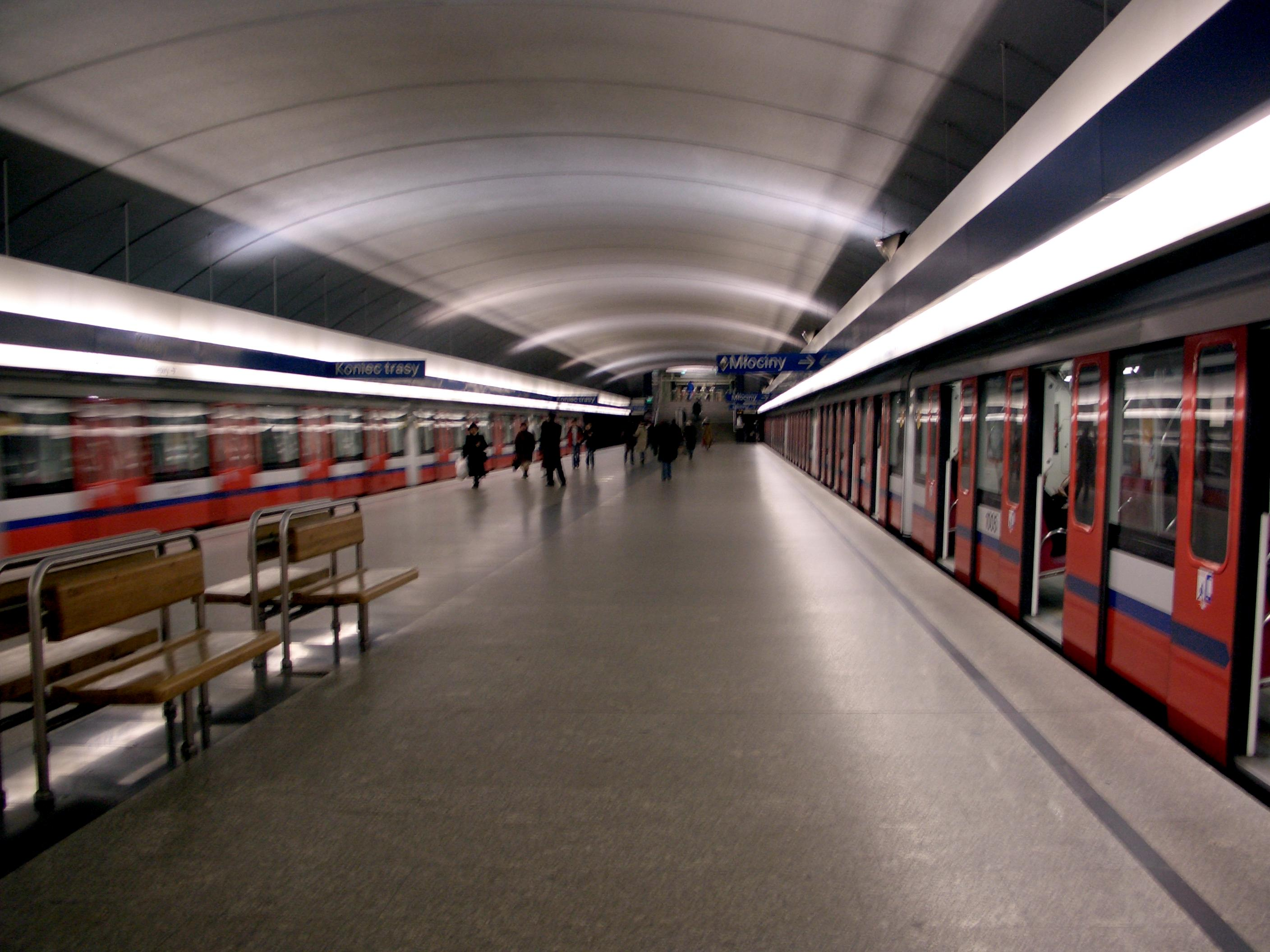
Two Metropolis trainsets at Kabaty metro station

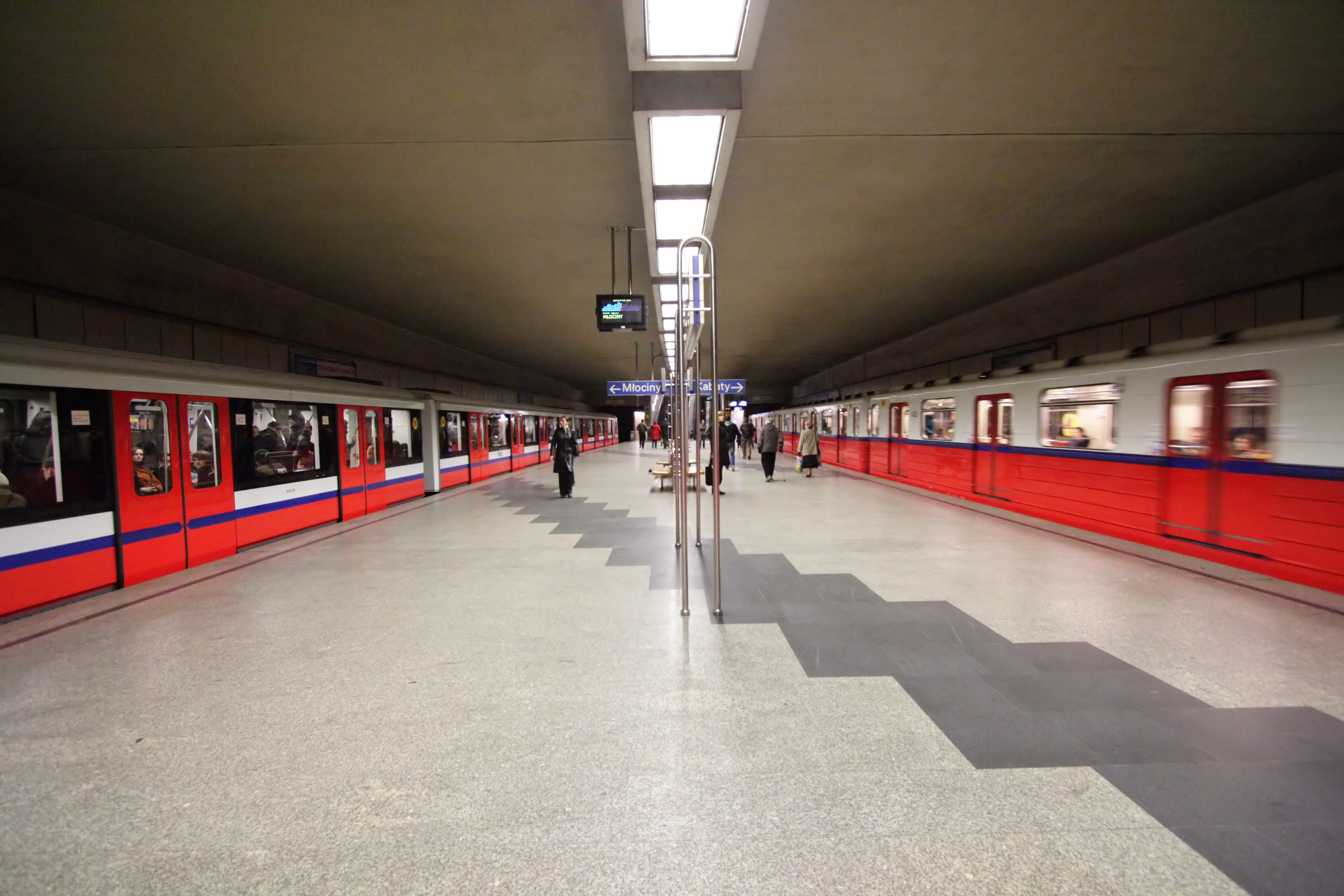
Metropolis wagons accompanied by an 81-series depot at Politechnika metro station

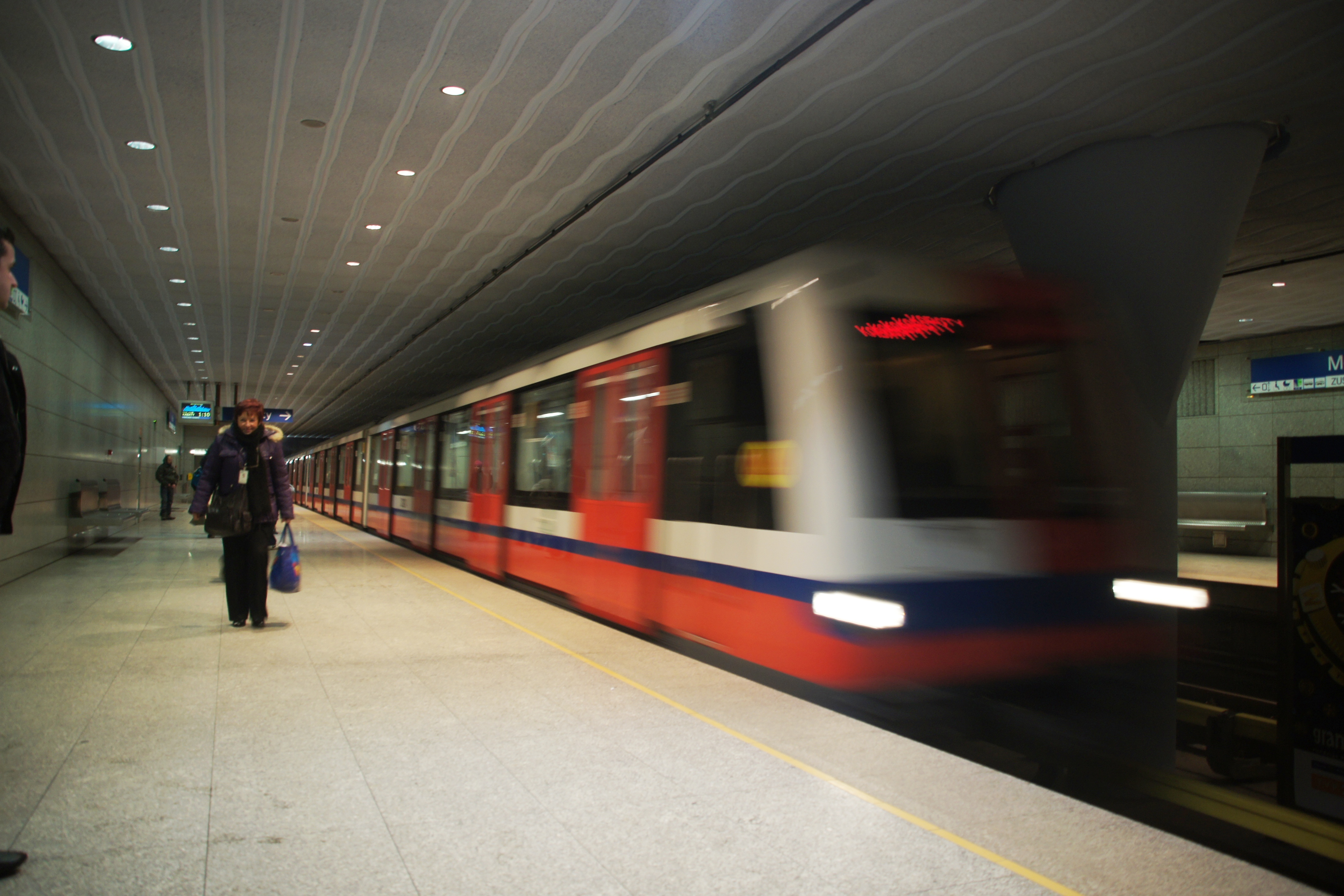
Metropolis entering Młociny metro station

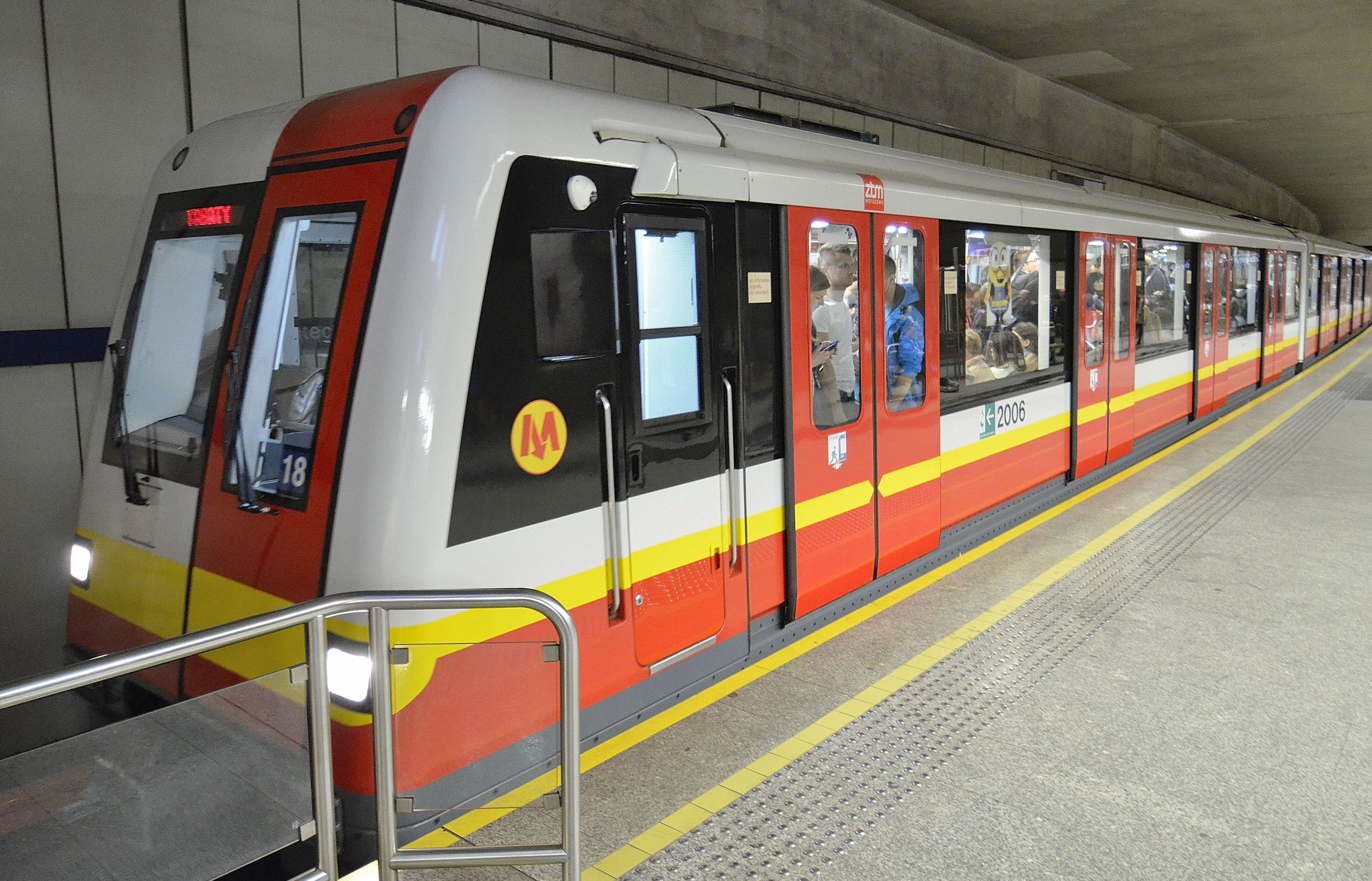
Metropolis in new colors at Politechnika metro station

On 30 September 2000, the first four Metropolis trains were put into operation.

On 11 May 2001, the day the Ratusz Arsenał metro station was opened, Warsaw Metro had 15 four-car trains of series 81 and 4 six-car Metropolis trains. During peak hours, they ran every 4 minutes and covered the entire 14 km route in 23 minutes.

The fourteenth Metropolis train, number 29, was put into operation on 28 October 2004, and train number 30 started running on line I of the metro on 3 December 2004. Train number 31 was put into operation on 30 December 2004.

On 8 April 2005, the day the Plac Wilsona metro station was opened, Warsaw Metro had 15 four-car trains of series 81 and 16 six-car Metropolis trains. During peak hours, they ran every 3–4 minutes and covered the entire 17.5 km route in 28 minutes.

On 6 June 2005, the last train of the Metropolis series, number 33, started operating on line I of the Warsaw Metro.

At the end of July 2014, the major repair of train number 17 was completed, which was the first to receive new colors.

At the beginning of February 2015, one Metropolis train had undergone a major repair, and three more were in the process. The carrier also announced a tender for the repair of the remaining 14 trains of this series, to be completed by 2018. At the end of that month, vehicles awaiting these major repairs and the delivery of parts began to be sidelined. The first trains to be sidelined were numbers 16, 19, and 20. On 30 March 2015, the tender announced a month earlier was canceled. In mid-January 2016, the next competition announced at the end of October 2015 was decided in favor of Pesa Mińsk Mazowiecki. At that time, 4 trains, numbers 20, 22, 23, and 24, were sidelined. The first trains were sent to Pesa at the beginning of July. In December, train number 24 was the first to return to Warsaw, and at the beginning of February 2017, it was undergoing final tests before being put back into operation.

In mid-February 2017, Warsaw Metro announced that between 2017 and 2018 it planned to equip Metropolis 98B trains with driver cab air conditioners.

==== Problem of wheel ovalization ====
At the turn of 2000 and 2001, residents of homes near metro tunnels began to complain about significant building vibrations associated with the passage of trains. Studies showed that excessive vibrations occurred during the transit of Metropolis train sets due to a phenomenon known as wheel ovalization. Identifying the cause of this defect took over a year. It was determined that the monoblock wheels used by Alstom wore unevenly around their circumference, causing the vibrations felt by Warsaw residents due to their irregular movement along the tracks.

By mid-2002, the problem of wheel ovalization had led to the suspension of further train deliveries.

At the beginning of 2003, eight defective trains were taken out of service, and the manufacturer began repairs, which involved re-machining the wheel sets. Fixing the defect in one train set took 72 hours, and repairing all eight trains took 24 days, ending on 18 March 2003.

In 2003, Warsaw Metro conducted negotiations with Alstom to address the manufacturing defects of its train cars. Since identifying these defects, the problem was temporarily resolved by re-machining the deformed wheels on a special track lathe installed at STP Kabaty. The manufacturer committed to replacing the faulty components with newly designed ones. In August 2004, Alstom provided Warsaw Metro with a financial compensation of 5 million PLN, covering only the cost of the new wheels. The total costs of replacing, inspecting, and maintaining the wheel sets in 15 Metropolis trains were estimated to be around 10 million PLN.

Problems with the wheel sets also delayed part of the final delivery of train cars planned for 2004.

Preparations for the wheel replacement operation began in early 2005, and in mid-2005, discussions with various companies commenced. Contracts with enterprises were signed at the end of 2005 and early 2006. In April 2006, the operation to replace the wheels and inspect and maintain the wheel sets in the Metropolis series cars began. Companies involved in the process included Bumar-Fablok Chrzanów (dismantling wheel sets, supervising the process, and reassembling), Flender AG (inspecting the main gearbox of the wheel set), SKS Sp. z o.o. (inspecting the wheel set bearings), Knorr-Bremse (inspecting brake discs), and Bonatrans (steelworks from Bohumín, wheel manufacturer), as well as the Tabor Railway Vehicle Institute (supervising the quality of wheels and the replacement process) and the Office of Rail Transport (issuance of operating permits).

By the end of 2008, it was planned to replace 336 wheels in 42 cars, and the replacement of a total of 720 wheels in 90 cars was planned to be completed by mid-2008. By August 2008, only half of the operation had been completed, so it was planned to complete 80% of the work by the end of 2008 and the remaining 20% by mid-2009.

On 31 March 2010, the replacement of defective wheels in all 18 Alstom Metropolis trains was finally completed. The last five sets received R9 steel wheels.

=== Line M2 of the Warsaw Metro ===
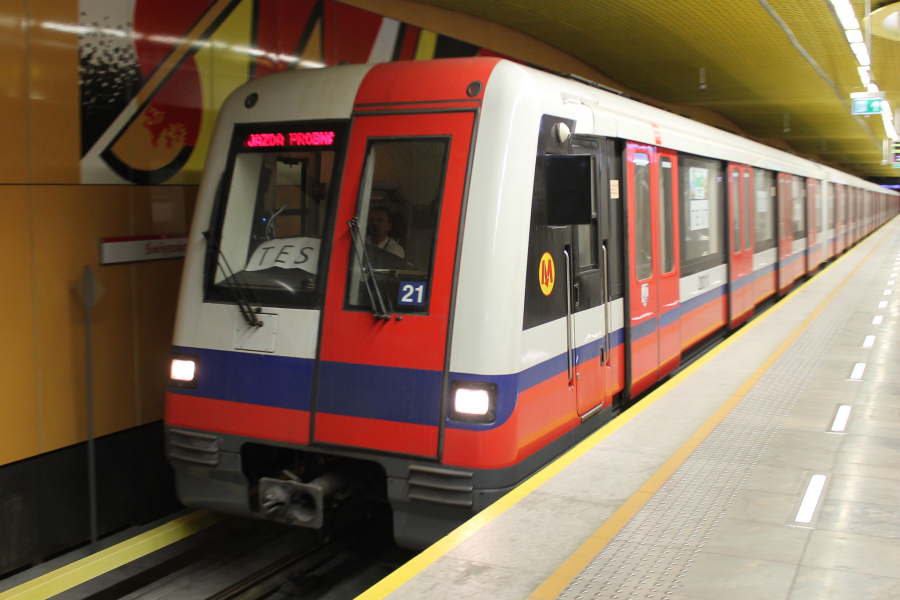
Metropolis Train No. 21 at Świętokrzyska metro station during tests on line M2

In 2012, Warsaw Metro planned to adapt the Metropolis trains for the upcoming second metro line. After the central section was built, but before the construction of the technical and parking station, the operator wanted to ensure full interoperability. Trains moving from Line I to Line II would undergo a special procedure lasting from 15 to 20 minutes.

On 10 September 2014, around 7:30 PM, Metropolis train number 32 made the first test run on the entire central section of Line M2, from Rondo Daszyńskiego metro station to Dworzec Wileński metro station.

From July 4 to August 15, 2015, test runs of train number 21 took place on the central section of Line M2. It operated without passengers between the trains serving the line. The tests aimed to check the control systems and the behavior of Alstom trains on this section, so they could be operated on Line M2 in the future.

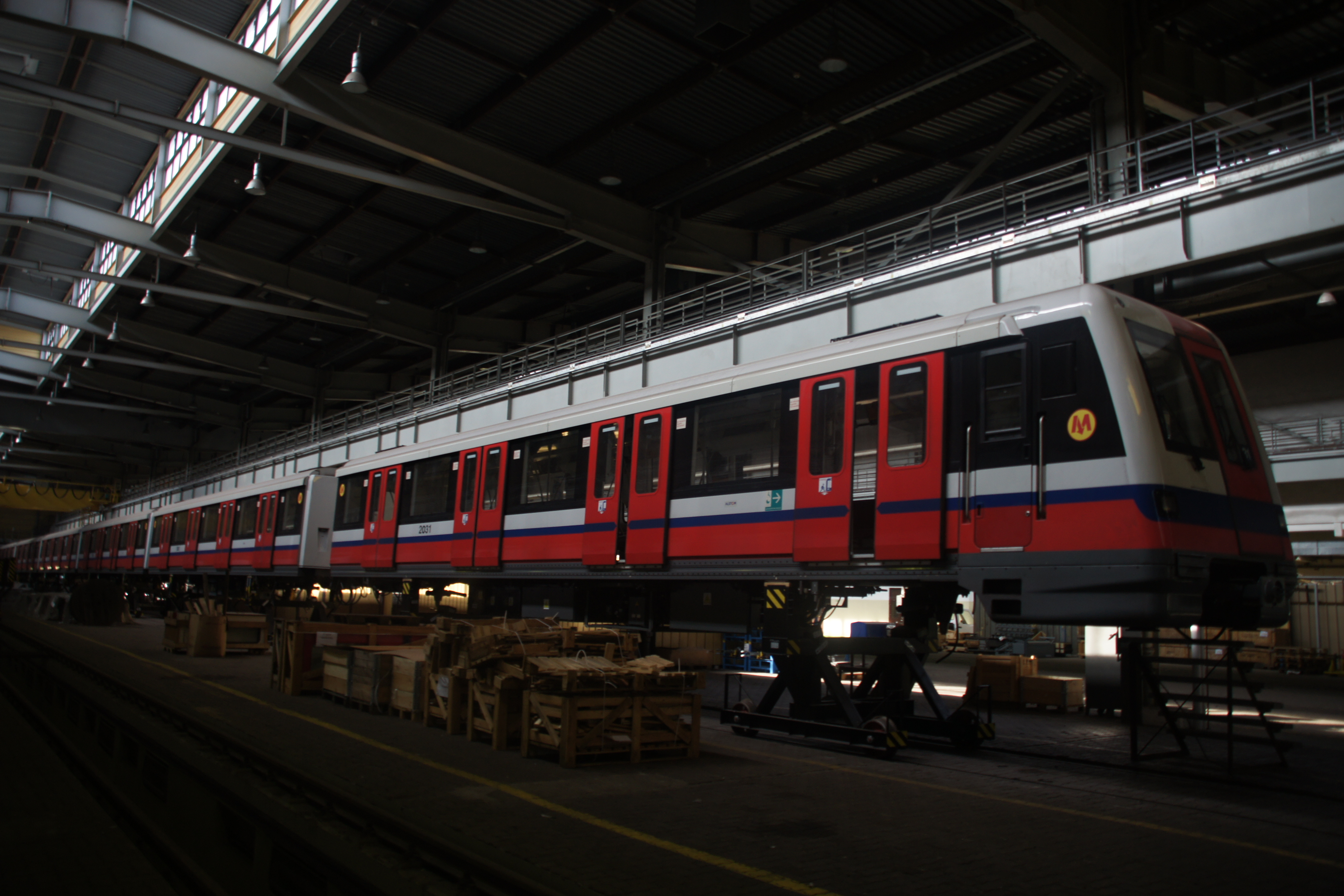
Metropolis during inspection at STB Kabaty

=== Inspections and repairs ===
Year	Number of inspections and repairs							Average annual mileage of Metropolis set	Sources
Year	PK (P1)	PO (P2)	PD (P3)	R1 (P4.1)	R2 (P4.2)	R3 (P4.3)	G (P5)	Average annual mileage of Metropolis set	Sources
2005	279	52	14	—N/a	3	—N/a	—N/a	from 100,000 to 120,000 km	
2006	307	61	6	12	5	—N/a	—N/a	about 120 500 km	
2007	346	68	16	1	—N/a	1	—N/a	123,954.8 km	
2008	N/A	N/A	N/A	4	5	7	N/A	N/A	
2009	353	74	15	6	—N/a	4	—N/a	about 129,554.1 km	
2010	370	73	11	7	1	—N/a	—N/a	128,081 km	
2011	366	69	5	5	6	5	—N/a	about 124,000 km	
2012	364	69	16	3	4	—N/a	—N/a	about 130,000 km	
2013	376	65	10	10	2	—N/a	—N/a	about 120,000 km	
2014	326	57	8	5	2	—N/a	1	about 96,800 km	
2015	269	45	9	—N/a	3	—N/a	3	87,400 km	

Inspections and repairs of Warsaw Metro's rolling stock are performed by Rolling Stock Service employees at STB Kabaty.

== See also ==
- Alstom Metropolis
- Metrovagonmash 81-717/81-714
- Siemens Inspiro
- Škoda Varsovia
