= Track IQ =

Australian railway equipment manufacturer

- Industry: Railway
- Headquarters: Kent Town, South Australia
- Area served: Global
- Parent: Wabtec
- Website: www.trackiq.com.au

Track IQ formerly known as Trackside Intelligence, is an international manufacturer and supplier of railway equipment and services for the purpose of measuring operating conditions. After developing the RailBAM (Bearing Acoustic Monitor) and WCM (Wheel Condition Monitoring) systems, Track IQ formed a partnership with Siemens to install the systems in the United Kingdom and Continental Europe.

In October 2015, Track IQ was acquired by Wabtec.

Track IQ, is installing wheel bearing and tread defect detection systems at 20 sites on key railway routes across India. In 2017, Track IQ acquired Imaging Technologies, which enabled the supplier to boost its capabilities to accurately measure wheel profile, brake and brake shoe condition FleetOne is a multi-sensor trending database product that extends the capability of the wayside monitoring hardware interface. The database integrates a range of wayside monitoring equipment data into a single system and facilitates vehicle monitoring and data mining via key vehicle metrics, which are delivered through a web-based application.

== Global coverage ==
Although Track IQ operates out of Australia, more than 150 of their systems have been installed around the world. The company currently services 14 countries, including Australia, New Zealand, Brasil, USA, South Africa, Mexico, Ireland, Northern Ireland, India, China, UK, Belgium, France and Norway.

== Awards ==
In 2014, Track IQ received the SNCF Innovation Award for its RailBAM (Bearing Acoustic Monitor) system, which detects damage to a train’s wheelset bearings at an early stage.
