= Dellner =

Swedish manufacturer

Dellner Couplers AB
- Type: Private
- Industry: Railway vehicle components
- Founded: 1941; 85 years ago
- Founder: Jan Dellner
- Headquarters: Vika, Sweden
- Area served: Worldwide
- Key people: Fredric Håkansson (CEO), Klaus Deller (Chairman)
- Products: Couplers, dampers, gangways
- Services: Aftermarket services and support for train connection systems
- Parent: Wabtec (2026–present); EQT Infrastructure (2019–2026)
- Website: www.dellner.com

Dellner Couplers AB is a Swedish original equipment manufacturer of train connection systems such as couplers, gangway systems and dampers. The headquarter of the company is in Vika in the Falun Municipality. The company operates 17 subsidiaries worldwide and employs approximately 1,200 people.

== History ==
Dellner was founded in 1941 by the Swedish engineer Jan Dellner. The first customer was Swedish State Railways, for whom the Engineering Bureau Dellner produced automatic couplers. In the following years, the company, based in the small town of Vika in central Sweden, expanded its business and supplied automatic couplers to numerous customers in Europe, such as the Paris Metro, SNCF, Rome Metro and Ferrovie dello Stato Italiane.

In 1960, Dellner changed its corporate strategy and focused solely on the Scandinavian and North American markets. In the following years, the company expanded into automatic couplers under the name AB Dellner Malmco in Scandinavia. At the same time, a subsidiary was established in North America. At the beginning of the 1980s, the company had around 90 employees working at its Swedish headquarters in Vika and in subsidiaries in the USA and Canada.

=== Global supplier of fully automatic rail couplers ===
A turning point in Dellner's corporate history came in 1983, when the company realigned its business strategy to supply train manufacturers and railway operators around the world with automatic train couplers. That decision marked the beginning of Dellner's gradual expansion as a global supplier of train coupling systems.

In recent years, the company has responded to the changing requirements of the rail industry. All over the world, increasing numbers of passenger trains have been developed which travel at ever higher speeds. That trend has made the safety of train couplings increasingly important. Dellner responded to that development in the railroad industry by considering the coupling of a train as a safety-relevant component of the entire train system. The former supplier of train couplings became a manufacturer of integrated coupling systems that have been equipped with numerous safety features over the years:

- In 1985, Dellner was the first manufacturer to launch a coupling with an integrated gas-hydraulic dampers.
- In 1993, Dellner improved the safety technology of automatic couplers by introducing a deformation tube that sits behind the pivot anchor. It improved energy absorption and helped engineers to create more space for the anti-climb protection and side buffers when designing the couplers.
- Since 2013, Dellner has been offering coupling systems as part of an integrated crash energy management system: With the use of software developed in-house, coupling systems can now be configured for each train type to provide optimum protection in the event of collisions and other train accidents.

Dellner's coupling business in Sweden has traded under various names over the years. In 1952, the Engineering Bureau Dellner was renamed Runnvika Mechanical Workshop. Later, the coupling business traded under the legal names Jan Dellner & Co, AB Dellner Malmco and finally as Dellner Couplers AB. In 1992, Dellner Invest AB was founded as an umbrella company for Dellner Couplers.

After the collapse of the Soviet Union and the economic opening of Eastern Europe, Dellner expanded into the countries of the former Warsaw Pact. After 1997, Poland became an important location for Dellner, with a branch in Gdynia at which an increasing amount of production capacity was created in subsequent years.

In 2003, the holding company Dellner Invest acquired a Swedish company called Precima, a specialist in dampers and buffers for trains and other industrial applications. The Precima business was integrated into a newly founded subsidiary called Dellner Dampers, which formed a new business unit of Dellner Invest.

In 2009, Dellner Invest acquired a British gangway systems manufacturer called Woodville, and created a new business unit of Dellner Invest called Dellner Woodville.

Until 2019, Dellner Couplers and Dellner Dampers were both part of the holding company Dellner Invest, which also included the companies Dellner Brakes, Dellner Woodville and Pintsch Bubenzer (50 percent).

In June 2019, EQT Infrastructure acquired Dellner Couplers, together with its global subsidiaries including Dellner Dampers from Dellner Invest. These two companies now operate under the Dellner Couplers brand.

Since then, the remaining companies of the parent holding company Dellner Invest (as well as some newly created companies) have been operating under the umbrella of the newly founded Dellner Group.

Dellner Couplers and Dellner Group are two entirely separate companies. Whereas Dellner Couplers is focused on providing train connection systems, Dellner Group is focused on delivering brakes, hydraulics, polymers and glass for various industries and the transportation sector.

In early 2021, Dellner acquired the couplers business of CAF MiiRA, a subsidiary of the Spanish train and bus producer Construcciones y Auxiliar de Ferrocarriles.

In March 2025, EQT announced that Dellner Couplers would be acquired by Wabtec. The company's acquisition by Wabtec was finalised in February 2026, in an agreement worth $960 million.

== Corporate structure ==
Dellner Couplers AB has been based in Vika, Sweden, since the company was founded in 1941. The international management team including CEO Fredric Håkansson, CFO Thomas Leander and COO Stephan Weng as well as many global business units such as Sales, HR, Dellner Service, R&D, Finance, Quality or Procurement are located here. Dellner has production and service facilities in India, Poland, Sweden, France, Germany, Italy, China, Australia, Brazil, Argentina, Singapore, the United Kingdom and the USA.

The main subsidiaries of Dellner Couplers are:

=== Dellner Sp. z o.o. ===
Since its foundation in 1997, Dellner Poland has developed as the largest production facility for automatic couplers within the Dellner companies. Dellner employs around 370 people locally at its plant in Miszewko near the port city of Gdynia. In addition to the production and final assembly of couplers, Poland also serves as Dellner's distribution center for various Eastern and Southern European countries.

=== Dellner India Pvt Ltd. ===
Dellner is represented in India by a total of 170 employees at two locations: a service center for couplers and gangways is located in Noida in the state of Uttar Pradesh, and Dellner has a production facility for gangways and couplers in Mevalurkuppam near the southern Indian port city of Chennai.

=== Dellner Limited ===
A further production facility is located in Swadlincote, England, where around 165 employees work on the development and production of gangways for the international market. In addition, the site is also responsible for the overhaul of couplers and gangways for the UK market.

=== Dellner, Inc. ===
Dellner has been active in the USA since the 1960s. Since 2012, the company has been operating under the name Dellner Inc. with two locations in Charlotte, North Carolina and Roseville, California, with over 40 employees. Dellner USA offers sales and service activities for rail customers in North America.

=== Dellner Train Connection Systems Co. ===
In China, Dellner has around 90 employees at its two locations in Shanghai and Wuhan. Dellner China's customer is the Chinese state-owned CRRC Group, for whom Dellner provides new couplers on the Chinese domestic market and the CRRC overseas markets as well as operators and maintainers in several cities, for whom Dellner delivers services for train connection systems.

=== Dellner Dampers AB ===
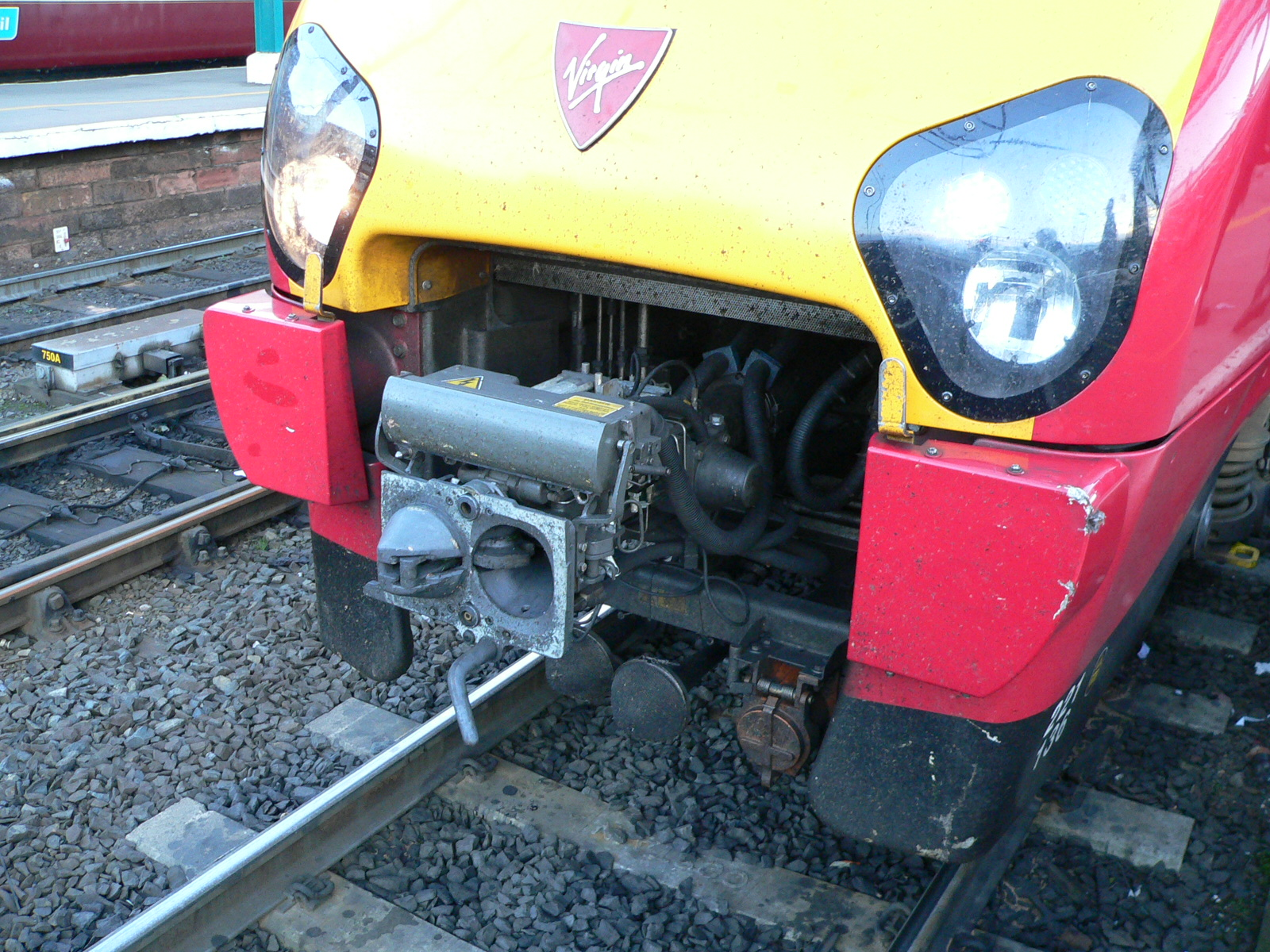
A Dellner coupler on a Virgin CrossCountry British Rail Class 221 in October 2005

Dellner Dampers AB specialises in customised dampers and is based in the small town of Flen in Södermanland County, Sweden.

== Research and Development ==
Dellner has a long tradition of researching and developing technologies related to couplers and, later, complete train connection systems. From the beginning, the company began adapting types of train couplers to the requirements of different passenger trains.

Today, Dellner manufactures all commercially available couplers for trains – from semi-permanent couplers to fully automatic couplers based on the Scharfenberg coupler principle, Tomlinson couplers and SA3 couplers. Dellner has also developed its own type of coupler head, the automatic coupler type 12.

Dellner has also made a name for itself with the modular design of train couplers, and the development of a crash energy management system for passenger trains.

=== Member of the DAC Delivery Program ===
Dellner has been a member of the Shift2Rail initiative and the European Union's DAC Delivery Program for the development of a digital automatic coupler for freight trains since 2020. The European Union's DAC Delivery Program has set itself the objective of modernising and standardising the couplers used in freight train fleets across the EU to make the coupling of freight trains safer and faster. To this end, all 400,000–450,000 freight wagons in Europe are to be equipped with fully automatic couplers in the coming years.

As part of that program, Dellner developed a digital automatic coupler in accordance with the DAC-4 standard, as well as a hybrid coupler for locomotives that can be used to simply convert old freight train fleets to the new technology. As a member of the European Union's DAC Delivery Program, Dellner is also working on the development of a digital coupler according to the DAC-5 standard.
