= Wabtec =

American manufacturing company

Westinghouse Air Brake Technologies Corporation
- Trade name: Wabtec Corporation
- Type: Public
- Traded as: NYSE: WAB; S&P 500 component
- Industry: Rail industry
- Founded: 1999; 27 years ago via merger
- Headquarters: Pittsburgh, Pennsylvania, United States
- Number of locations: Various: US, Europe, Canada, Mexico, Australia, South America. ~50 plants
- Key people: Albert J. Neupaver (chairman); Rafael Santana (president and CEO); John Olin (executive vice president and CFO
- Products: Rail braking systems, locomotives, air condition and heat exchanging systems, other rolling stock components
- Services: Locomotive servicing, overhaul and repair
- Revenue: ▲US$11.17 Billion (2025)
- Operating income: ▲US$1.79 Billion (2025)
- Net income: ▲US$1.17 Billion (2025)
- Total assets: ▲US$22.06 Billion (2025)
- Total equity: ▲US$11.19 Billion (2025)
- Number of employees: 29,500 (2024)
- Divisions: Dellner; Faiveley Transport; GE Transportation; MotivePower
- Website: wabteccorp.com
- Footnotes; Financials as of December 31, 2025. References

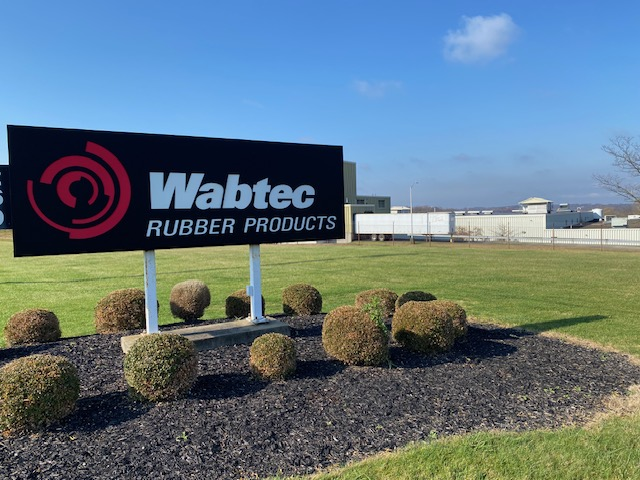
Wabtec facility, Greensburg, Pennsylvania

Westinghouse Air Brake Technologies Corporation, commonly known as Wabtec, is an American rail equipment company formed by the merger of the Westinghouse Air Brake Company (WABCO) and MotivePower in 1999. It is headquartered in Pittsburgh, Pennsylvania.

Wabtec manufactures products for locomotives, freight cars and passenger transit vehicles, and builds new locomotives up to 6,000 horsepower (4 MW). It is a Fortune 500 company.

The company purchased GE Transportation on February 25, 2019.

== History ==
The company's origins go back to 1869 with the founding of the Westinghouse Air Brake Company. That company (known as WA&B and later also as WABCO) became independent in 1990 via a management buy-out, and went public in 1995. (Another company, WABCO Vehicle Control Systems, also created from the Westinghouse Brake Company, is independent of Wabtec. It was spun off by American Standard Companies in 2007, and is today part of German automotive components firm ZF Friedrichshafen.

The other company forming Wabtec, MotivePower, can be traced back to 1972, with the formation of the MK Rail division by Morrison Knudsen and the purchase of a manufacturing facility in Boise. In 1994 Morrison Knudsen created a subsidiary MK Rail Corporation; during the first half of the same decade the MK Rail group expanded with the acquisition of various other locomotive component companies. In 1996, MK Rail group separated from the parent Morrison Knudsen and adopted the name MotivePower Industries Corporation. In the later half of the 1990s additional companies were acquired – again all in the locomotive components business. MotivePower, a wholly owned subsidiary of Wabtec, continues to manufacture locomotives.

The corporate logo is said to represent an axial view of a mechanical brake valve, where different air ports line up between the 'stator' and 'rotor' depending upon the handle position.

On June 10, 2023, United Electrical, Radio and Machine Workers of America workers at Wabtec's Erie, Pennsylvania, plant went on strike. Issues included pay, healthcare benefits, paid time off, prohibitions on grievance strikes, and the number of tier-4 emission rules compliant locomotives built at the Erie plant. The strike ended on August 31 with an agreement that raised the pay of workers.

== Mergers and acquisitions ==
Examples of notable mergers and acquisitions by Wabtec include:

- April 1998 - RFS Industries for $10 million, rebranding it to Wabtec Rail UK.
- March 2010 - Xorail, railway signaling design and construction company, for $40 million
- July 2010 - G&B Specialties, track products manufacturer, for $31.8 million
- August 2010 - Bach-Simpson Corporation, locomotive component supplier for $12.0 million
- November 2010 - Swiger Coil Systems, Cleveland-based manufacturer of traction motors and electric coils, for approximately $43.0 million
- February 2011 - Brush Traction, English locomotive builder and maintainer, for $31 million
- November 2011 - Bearward Engineering, English industrial radiator manufacturer
- June 2012 - Mors Smitt Holding for $88.4 million
- October 2012 - LH Group, diesel engine, transmission and bogie overhaul and industrial locomotive supplier for $48 million
- June 2014 - Fandstan Electric Group, rail and industrial equipment manufacturer, comprising the Brecknell Willis, Stemmann Technik and TransTech brands for $199.4 million
- June 2015 - Metalocaucho (MTC), producer of suspension and anti-vibration systems for $23.4 million
- December 2016 - acquired 51% of Faiveley Transport's shares in a cash-and-stock deal valued at $1.7 billion, including debt
- August 2014 - Dia-Frag, manufacturer of friction products including motorcycle braking, for $70.6 million.
- October 2015 - Track IQ, lineside sensor manufacturer
- March 2018 - ANNAX, a German passenger information systems (PIS) manufacturer
- February 2019 - GE Transportation for $11 billion
- January 2022 - Masu, New Delhi-based railway friction company, for $34 million
- April 2022 - Trimble’s Beena Vision business
- June 2022 - Collins Aerospace ARINC rail solutions
- June 2023 - L&M Radiator, heat exchanger manufacturer in Hibbing, Minnesota
- July 2025 - Evident's Inspection Technologies for $1.78 billion
- December 2025 - Frauscher Sensor Technology Group, Schärding, Austria-based manufacturer of railway signalling for $783.9 million
- February 2026 - Dellner Couplers for $968 million

=== Merger with GE Transportation ===
On April 20, 2018, it was reported that General Electric (GE), undergoing a strategic review, was in talks to sell its century-old locomotive business, GE Transportation, to Wabtec, according to people familiar with the matter. On May 21, 2018, GE and Wabtec confirmed the merger of GE Transportation with Wabtec in an $11 billion deal, completed on February 25, 2019, which saw Wabtec shareholders take a 50.8% shareholding in the merged company, with GE shareholders owning 24.3% and GE itself 24.9%.

== Battery electric locomotive ==
In September 2021, at an event in Pittsburgh, Wabtec unveiled the world’s first battery-electric freight locomotive. It was the result of a joint venture with Carnegie Mellon University, and is part of an initiative by the two organizations to develop zero-emissions technology. Using a traditional locomotive body, the usual diesel engine has been replaced by a large bank of batteries, which drive the traction motors of the locomotive. Regenerative braking is used to help recharge the batteries.

Wabtec claimed that the next version of the locomotive, to be developed within two years, would reduce the consumption of diesel fuel by nearly a third, and that emissions could be entirely eliminated through the development of accompanying hydrogen fuel cells.

The first battery locomotives were for the Roy Hill railway line.
