= Roy Hill railway line =

Private railway in Pilbara region of Western Australia

Roy Hill railway
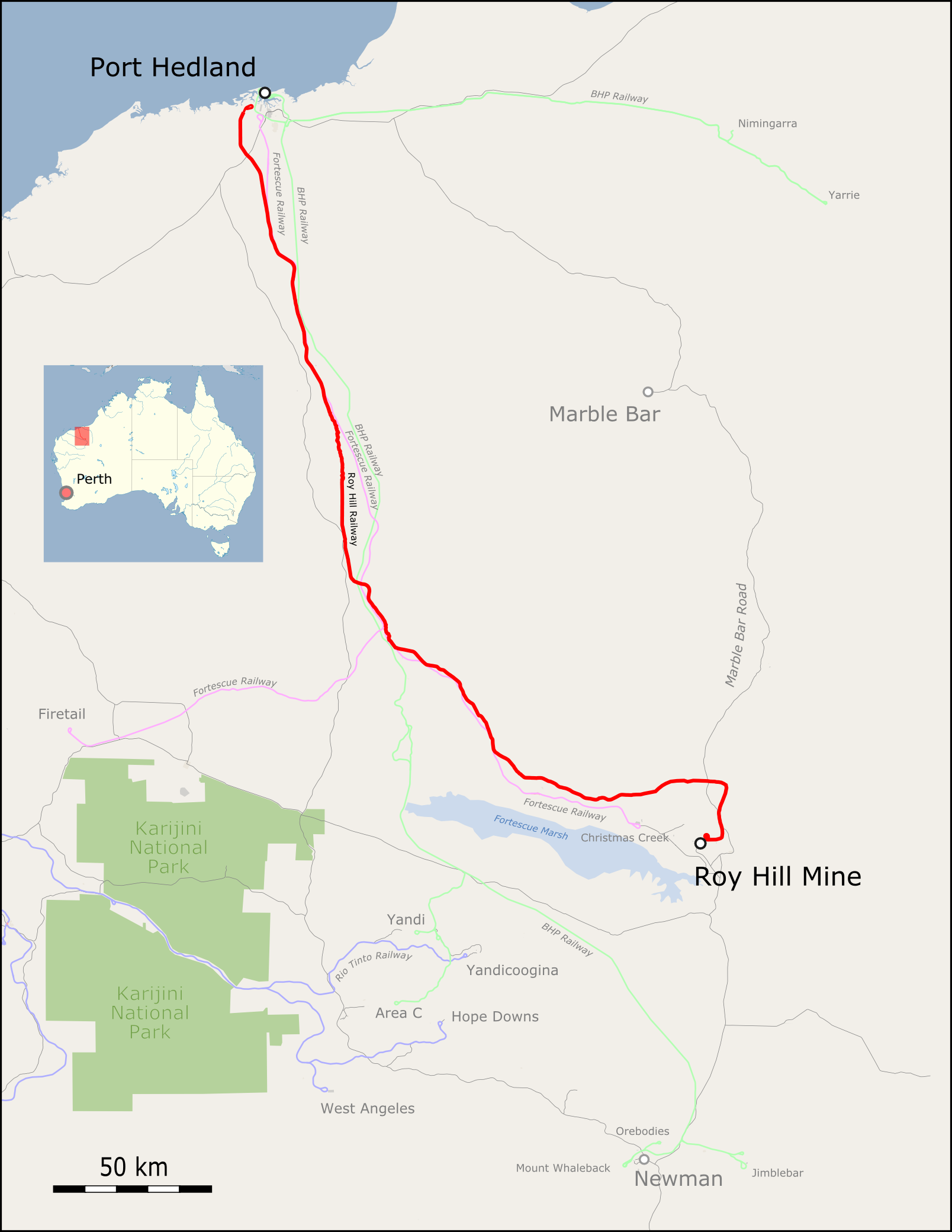
- Map of the Roy Hill railway

Overview
- Status: Operational
- Locale: Pilbara, Western Australia
- Termini: Roy Hill mine; Port Hedland, SP1 & SP2 Berths

Service
- Type: Heavy rail
- System: Pilbara
- Operator: Roy Hill Infrastructure Pty Ltd

History
- Opened: 2015

Technical
- Line length: 344 km (213.75 mi)
- Track gauge: 1,435 mm (4 ft 8 1/2 in)
- Train protection system: ATC using satellite communication instead of balises

The Roy Hill railway, officially the Roy Hill Infrastructure railway, owned and operated by Hancock Prospecting, is a private rail network in the Pilbara region of Western Australia built to carry iron ore.

In addition to the Hancock Prospecting network, several other independent iron ore rail lines comprise the Pilbara Iron Ore Railways:

- Rio Tinto's Hamersley & Robe River railway
- Fortescue Metals Group's Fortescue railway
- BHP's Goldsworthy and Mount Newman railways.

== History ==
Railways in the Pilbara region. Roy Hill railway in magenta .

An application to construct the Roy Hill railway was lodged with the Environmental Protection Authority of Western Australia in October 2010. In the original application, the operator of the railway line, Roy Hill Infrastructure Pty Ltd, proposed to build a 320 km (198.84 mi) long railway line from the Roy Hill mine to the Port of Port Hedland. Construction was scheduled to take 24 months and the operational lifespan expectancy was greater than 20 years.

Approval for the line was granted in November 2010 but amended in May 2011, increasing the railway line's length to 351 km (218.10 mi) as it was required to take a more northerly route than originally planned on the final stretch to the Roy Hill mine. The route change was necessary because Roy Hill Infrastructure was unable to obtain permission from third-party mining lease-holders to construct the railway as originally approved.

Construction of the railway on Crown land required the passing of the Railway (Roy Hill Infrastructure Pty Ltd) Agreement Act 2010 as an amendment to the Railways (Access) Act 1998 by the Parliament of Western Australia.

The construction of the railway commenced in 2012 and was completed after 27 months, with the first ore train traveling the line in December 2015. The new railway included eight bridges over waterways and three over roads and rails. The project jointly won the 2016 Railway Project Award of the Railway Technical Society of Australasia, alongside the Auckland Electrification Project. The combined construction cost of the mine, port and rail was A$10 billion, with a daily cost of A$10 million and a work force of 3,000 reported in 2014.

The company currently operates ES44ACIs diesel-electric locomotives, manufactured by US company Wabtec, to pull their trains carrying 35,000 tonnes of iron ore. Two new units as well as 150 ore cars were painted pink to raise breast cancer awareness in 2018.

In late 2021, Roy Hill announced plans to test fully-battery-powered heavy-haul locomotives. They envision recharging the batteries while dynamic braking on the heavily-loaded downhill runs. The first FLXdrive battery-electric locomotive was unveiled at Wabtec's design and development center on 31 October 2023. However, this unit was never delivered to Australia, and is now used by GE Transportation as its GECX 2025.
