= Vika, Sweden =

Vika
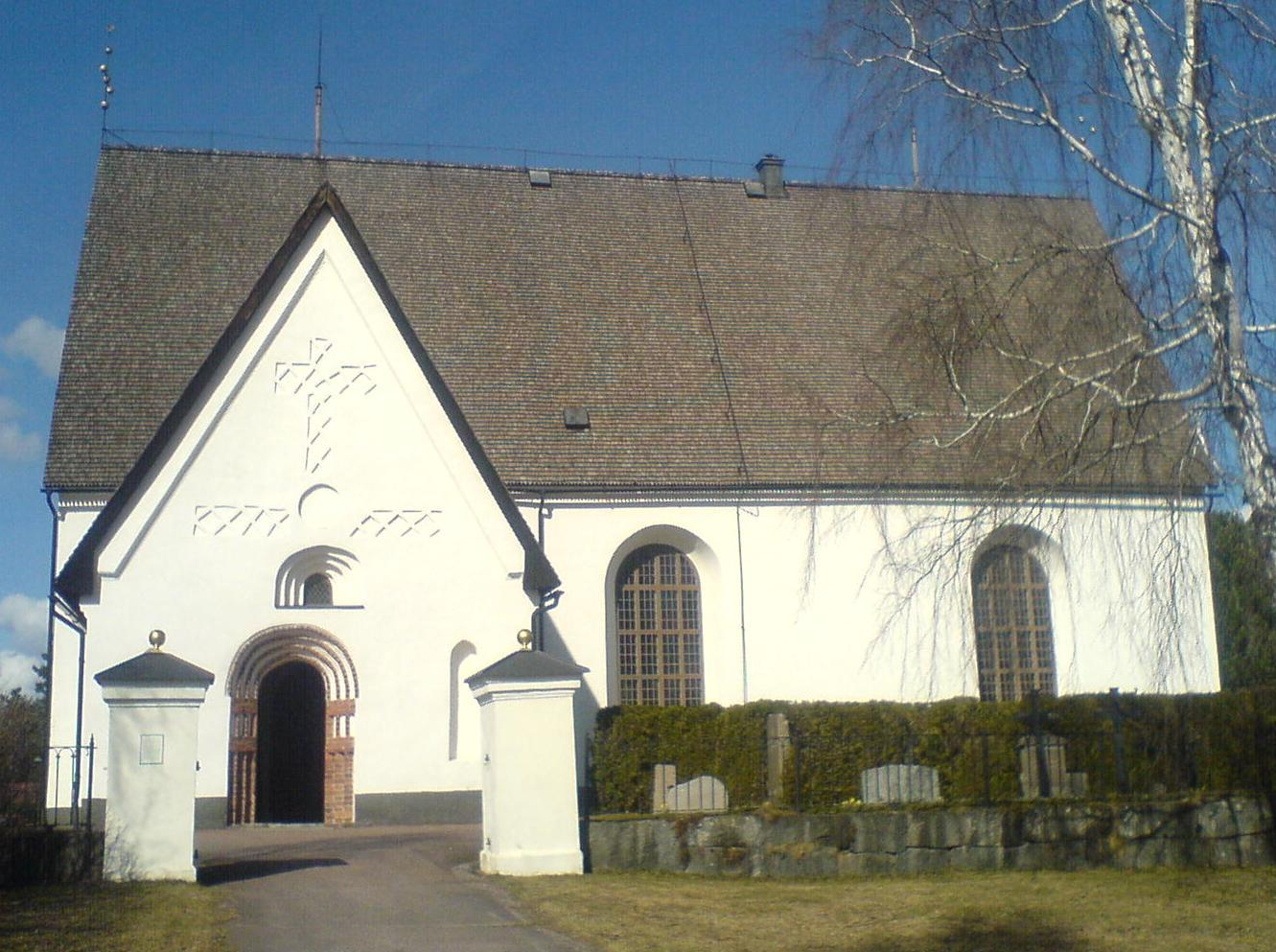
- Vika church

- Location within Dalarna Location within Sweden
- Coordinates: 60°31′N 15°43′E
- Country: Sweden
- Province: Dalarna
- County: Dalarna County
- Municipality: Falun Municipality

Area
  - Total: 0.60 km^{2} (0.23 sq mi)

Population (31 December 2010)
  - Total: 445
  - Density: 744/km^{2} (1,930/sq mi)
- Time zone: UTC+1 (CET)
  - Summer (DST): UTC+2 (CEST)
- Climate: Dfb

Vika is a locality situated in Falun Municipality, Dalarna County, Sweden with 445 inhabitants in 2010.
