= Liquor Control Act 1988 =

Parliament of Western Australia
- Long title: An Act to regulate the sale, supply and consumption of liquor, the use of premises on which liquor is sold, and the services and facilities provided in conjunction with or ancillary to the sale of liquor, to minimise harm or ill-health caused to people, or any group of people due to the use of liquor, to provide for orders that may prohibit persons from being employed at, or from entering, licensed premises, to repeal the Liquor Act 1970, and for related matters.
- Citation: No. 54 of 1988
- Royal assent: 9 December 1988

The Liquor Control Act 1988 is an act of the Western Australian parliament which serves to regulate liquor and its sale, supply, and consumption, as well as to minimise harm due to the use of liquor, amongst other things. The act repealed the Liquor Act 1970 and was given royal assent on 9 December 1988.

== Parts ==
=== Part 2—The licensing authority ===
Part 2 of the act establishes the Liquor Commission, its jurisdiction, and its constitution. The Liquor Commission has a number of functions, including the review of liquor licenses, related complaints and costs, and providing policy advice regarding the control of liquor.

=== Part 3—Licences and permits ===
Part 3 of the act concerns liquor licences, including how they are granted, who may hold them, and sets out the meaning of licensed premises, and penalties for supplying liquor in non-licensed premises, amongst other related things.

=== Part 4—The conduct of business ===
Part 4 of the act concerns hours of business, responsible practices in selling, supplying, and serving liquor, the consumption of liquor, and penalties for non-compliance.

=== Part 5—Financial provisions ===
Part 5 of the act concerns fees for liquor licences, regulations relating to licensing fees, subsidies, and recovery of illegal gains, amongst other things.

=== Part 5A—Prohibition orders ===
Part 5A of the act concerns prohibition orders—orders that prohibit someone working at licensed premises or entering such premises.

=== Part 5AA—Protected entertainment precincts ===
Part 5AA of the act concerns 'protected entertainment precincts' (PEPs). The purpose of part 5AA as per the legislation is the minimisation of harm, public disturbance and disorder, and other adverse effects "in relation to a concentration of licensed premises".

==== Background ====
On 5 July 2020, Giuseppe Raco, the manager of the Paramount nightclub in Northbridge, whose nickname was "Pep", was punched from behind by a 26-year-old man, who had been "drinking all day". Raco never regained consciousness.

==== Protected entertainment precincts ====
The Western Australian parliament passed the Liquor Control Amendment Act (Protected Entertainment Precincts) Act 2022 on 30 November 2022. The Act came into effect on 24 December 2022, and establishes five "Protected Entertainment Precincts" (PEPs)—named in honour of "Pep" Raco—across the Perth metropolitan area, in Northbridge and Perth, Fremantle, Scarborough, Hillarys, and Mandurah. The precincts are areas where there is a high concentration of licensed premises, with Western Australian police able to issue an on-the-spot exclusion order for up to six months for "unlawful, antisocial, disorderly, offensive, indecent and threatening way" in a precinct or "the person being in the precinct could cause violence or public disorder or impact the safety of others". Those convicted of a serious violent or sexual crime, including murder, manslaughter, grievous bodily harm, amongst others, and are convicted on or after 24 December 2022, will automatically be banned from the precincts for five years after their release from custody. Exemptions also apply to those who have been banned, including if they live, work, or attends educational institutions in the precincts.

=== Part 5B—Liquor restricted premises ===
Part 5B of the act concerns liquor restricted premises, which are premises that are "the subject of a liquor restriction declaration".

=== Part 6—Enforcement ===
Part 6 of the act concerns the enforcement of the regulations in the act, and gives powers of entry to "authorised officers", powers to seize to police officers, and other related things.
