= Network Aviation =

Airline of Australia

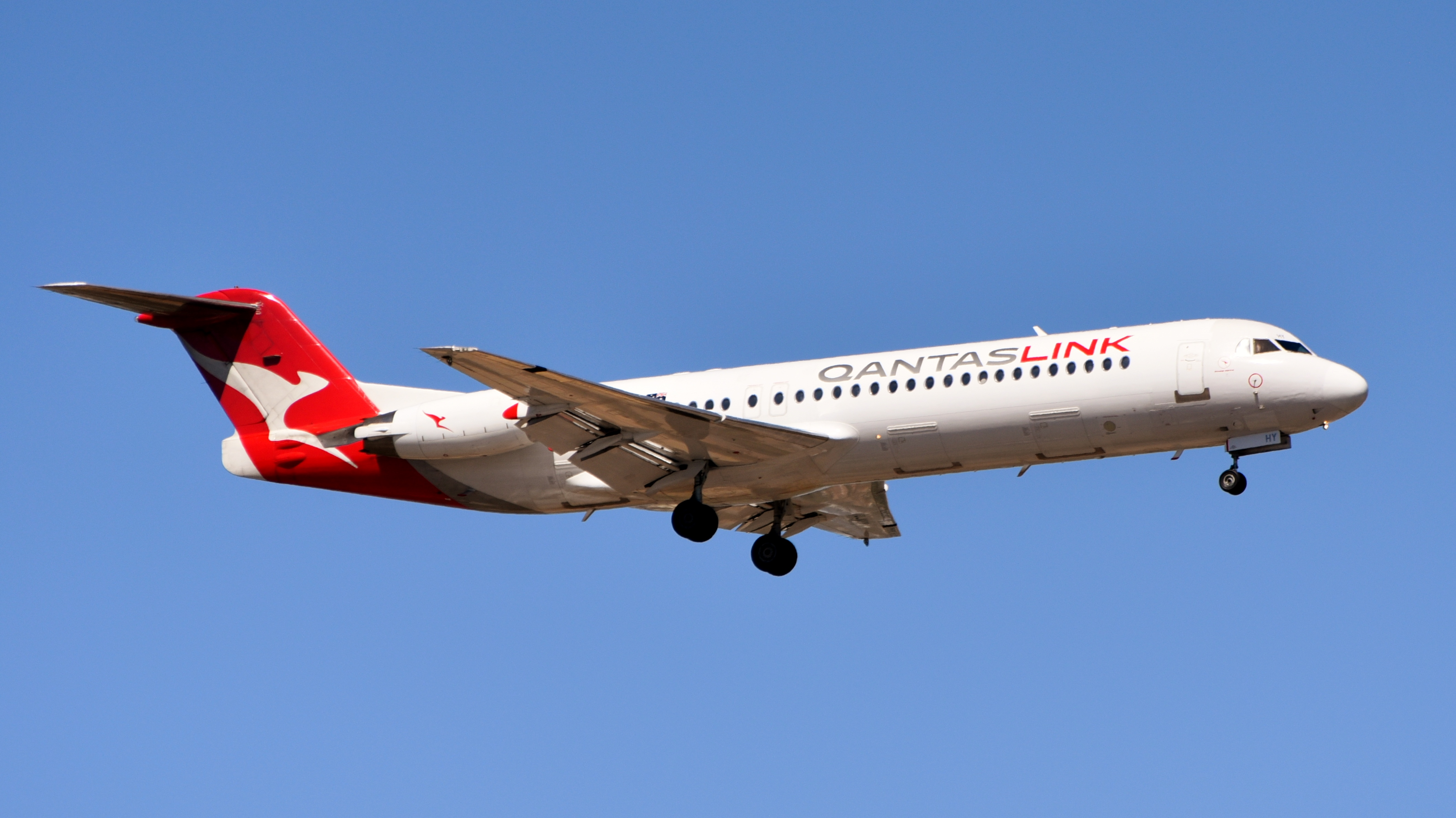
- Network Aviation Fokker 100 in QantasLink livery
IATA	ICAO	Call sign
—	NWK	NET-LINK
- Founded: 1998
- AOC #: CASA.AOC.0006
- Operating bases: Perth Airport
- Frequent-flyer program: Qantas Frequent Flyer
- Alliance: Oneworld
- Subsidiaries: Network Turbine Solutions
- Fleet size: 40
- Destinations: 22
- Parent company: Qantas
- Headquarters: Redcliffe, Western Australia
- Website: www.networkaviation.com.au

Network Aviation is an airline based at Perth Airport, operating regular scheduled and air charter services in support of fly-in fly-out mining operations throughout Western Australia and limited regular scheduled services interstate. Since 2015, Network Aviation has primarily flown under the QantasLink brand. In partnership with subsidiary engineering provider Network Turbine Solutions, Network Aviation operates over 50 flights a week on behalf of mining companies to facilitate crew changes at remote sites.

== History ==
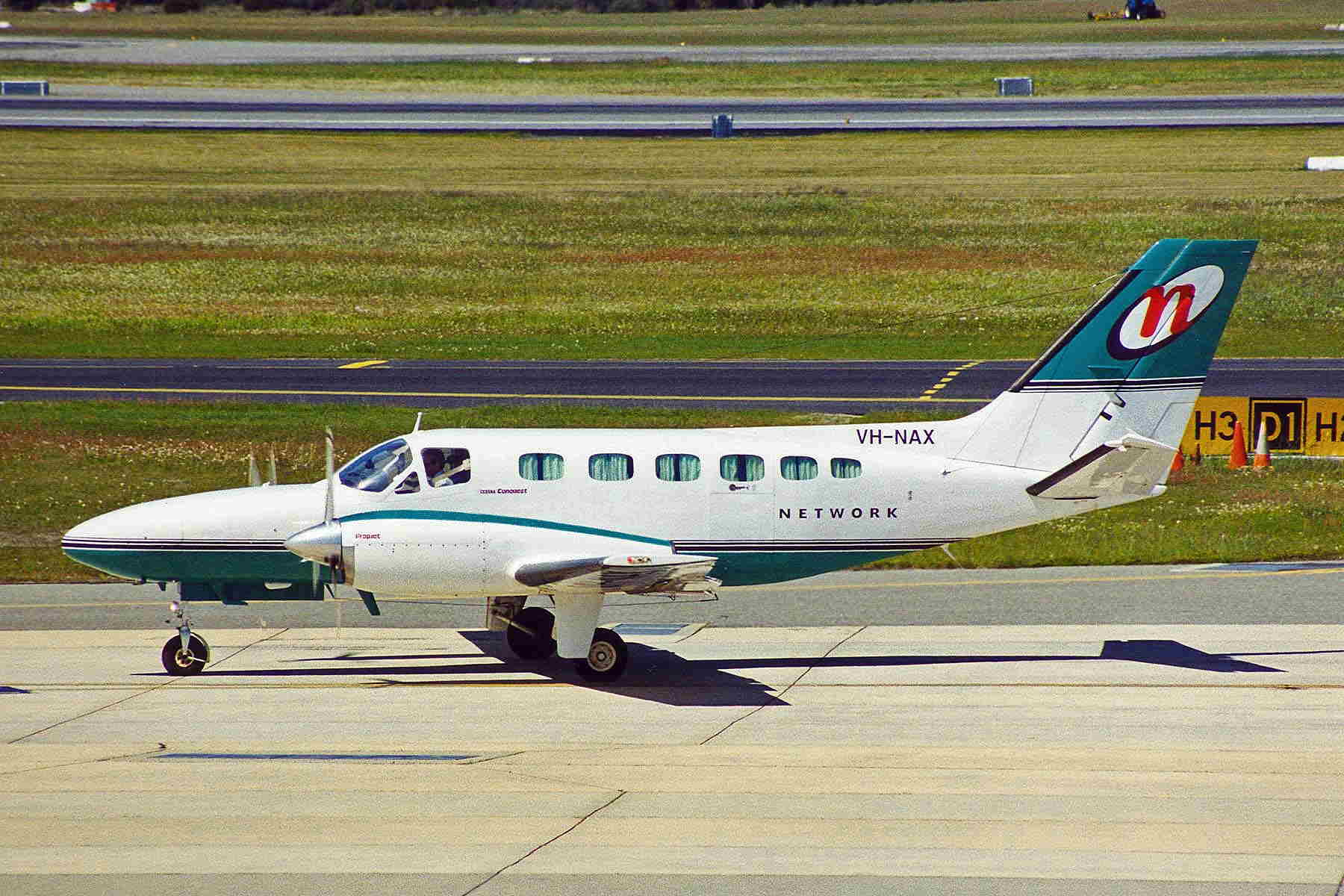
Cessna 441 Conquest II in 1999

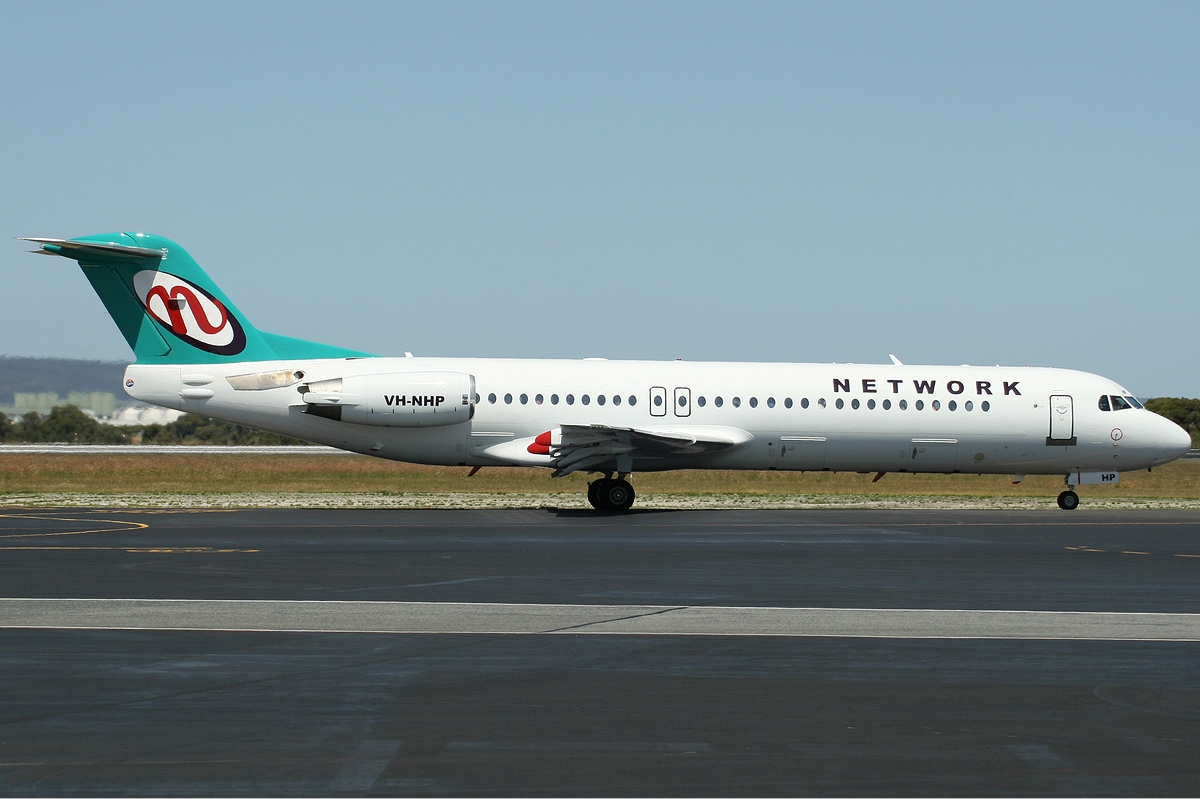
Fokker 100 in an earlier livery in 2008

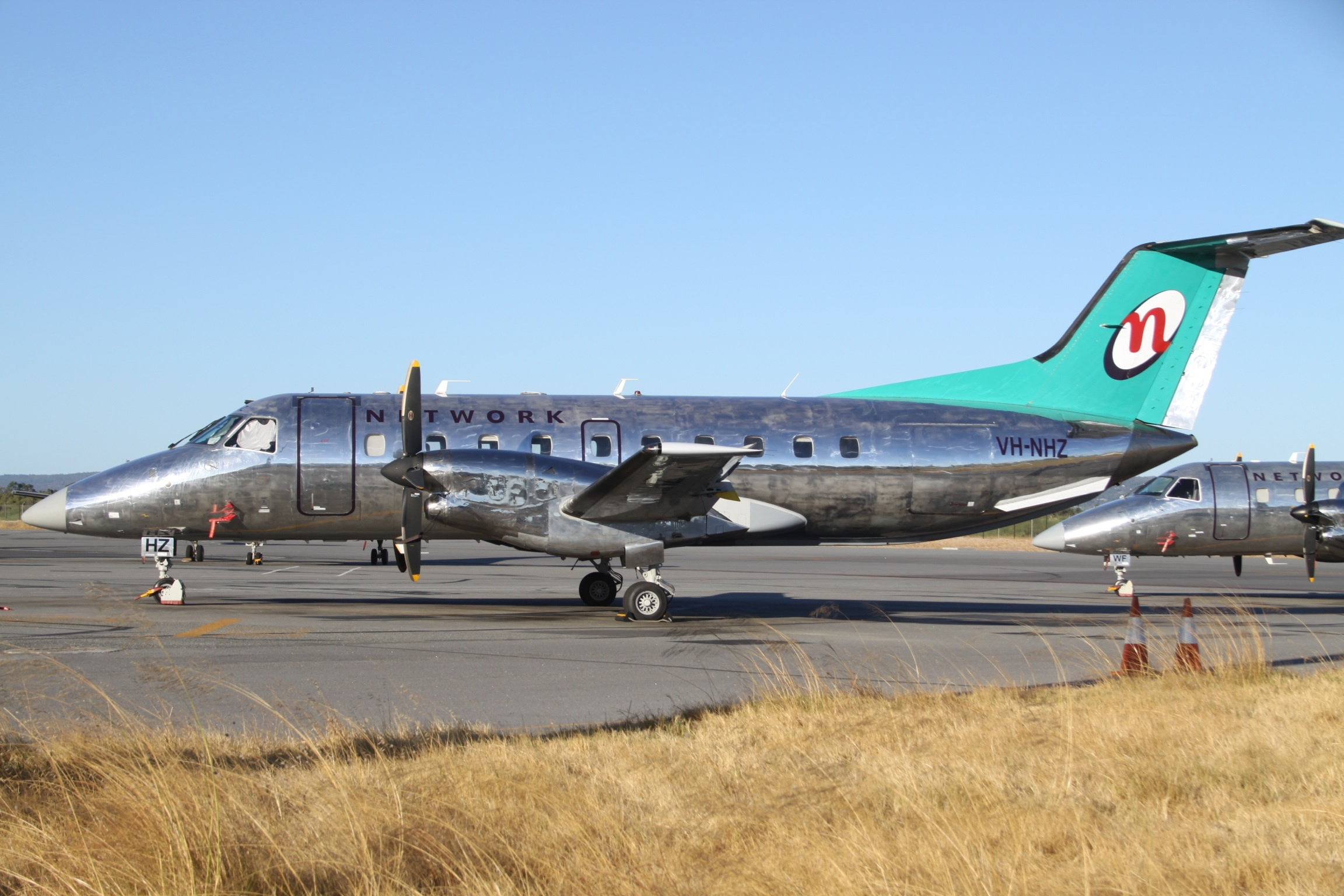
Embraer EMB-120ER in polished aluminium livery in 2012

After assisting to establish Skippers Aviation, Lindsay Evans founded Network in 1998. Originally operating a mix of smaller aircraft types such as Cessna 441 Conquest IIs, Cessna 310s and Beechcraft Super King Airs, in partnership with key clients Network grew into larger types and commenced operating Embraer Brasilias in 2000 and Fokker 100s in 2008.

In February 2011, Network Aviation was purchased by Qantas. Network retains its current management, employees and operating structure, with the business to be aligned with Qantas' operations, standards and processes. With the purchase, Qantas stated it was looking at significantly growing Network's fleet and operations. On taking over Network, Qantas announced that it was purchasing ten Fokker 100 aircraft for the company.

In May 2014, Network Aviation received approval to operate three weekly services from Perth to Exmouth with Fokker 100s.

In March 2015, QantasLink ceased its scheduled turboprop aircraft operations in Western Australia. Network Aviation took over services to Geraldton and some services to Exmouth. On 31 July 2015, Qantas announced that the Fokker 100 aircraft would be progressively repainted in QantasLink colours.

In September 2016, Network Aviation became an affiliate member of the Oneworld airline alliance.

In January 2018, Network Aviation confirmed it would transfer two Airbus A320s from Jetstar for flights to and from Perth as part of the QantasLink brand. Network Aviation has steadily increased its use of ex-Jetstar Airbus A320s since then to a total of 19.

In February 2023, Qantas announced an order for five mid-life Airbus A319s to increase short term capacity and support the growth of the resource sector in Western Australia for delivery from 2024. Qantas announced in February 2024, following a strong performance in the resources sector that four additional A319 aircraft had been purchased, bringing the total to nine.

On 25 June 2025, Qantaslink announce that the Embraer E190 was selected as the preferred replacement for the Fokker 100 fleet, up to 14 aircraft will be sourced for targeted delivery beginning at the end of 2026. The retirement of the Fokker 100 will begin early with the arrival of four Airbus A320s from defunct Jetstar Asia, bring the total to 19. The First E190 to join the Network Aviation Fleet arrived into Perth on the 8th of September 2026 with the intention of entering service in Late 2026/Early 2027.

Following retirement from passenger service in 2026, VH-NHO, the first Fokker 100 to enter service with Network Aviation in 2008, and VH-NPU were donated to the Historical Aircraft Restoration Society in Parkes and Shellharbour respectively for use as static displays

== Destinations ==
Network Aviation operates regular services to fixed schedules from Perth Airport to the following destinations in Western Australia:. The airline also operates a number of charters to select destinations to facilitate "Fly-In, Fly-Out" working rosters on mining sites.

New South Wales

- Newcastle

Northern Territory

- Darwin

Tasmania

- Hobart

Western Australia

- Gascoyne region
  - Exmouth (Learmonth Airport)
- Goldfields–Esperance region
  - Carosue Dam
  - Kalgoorlie
- Kimberley region
  - Broome
  - Koolan Island
- Mid West region
  - Geraldton
- Pilbara region
  - Boolgeeda
  - Buttbreak iron ore mine
  - Christmas Creek mine (Graeme Rowley Aerodrome)
  - Cloudbreak mine (Fortescue Dave Forrest Airport)
  - Iron Bridge mine
  - Eliwana mine
  - Karratha
  - Ken's Bore mine
  - Newman
  - Onslow
  - Paraburdoo
  - Port Hedland
  - Roy Hill Mine (Ginbata Airport)
  - Solomon Hub iron ore mine (Solomon Airport)
  - Wodgina mine
  - West Angelas mine
- South West region
  - Busselton

Overseas Territories

- Christmas Island - Christmas Island Airport
- Cocos (Keeling) Island - Cocos (Keeling) Island Airport

== Fleet ==
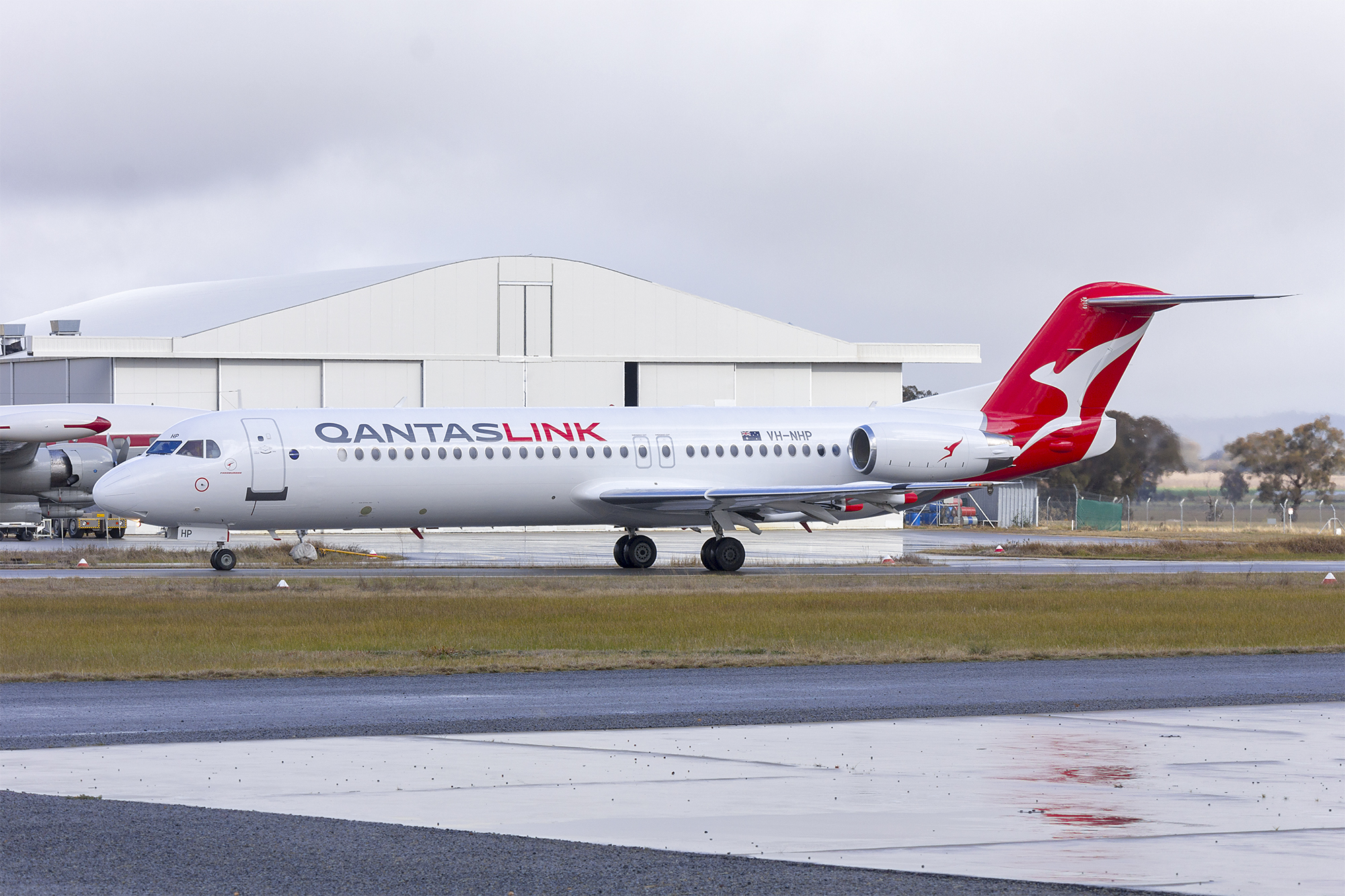
Fokker 100 in QantasLink new roo livery at Wagga Wagga Airport in July 2017

=== Current fleet ===
As at May 2026, Network Aviation operates

Aircraft	In service	Orders	Passengers (Y)	Notes
Airbus A319-100	9	—	150	Former Spirit Airlines aircraft.
Airbus A320-200	19	—	180	Former Jetstar and Jetstar Asia Aircraft
Embraer E190	—	3	100 (TBC)	Up to 14 aircraft planned. First aircraft expected to enter service Q4 2026
Fokker 100	12	—	100	Former Tyrolean Airways and Avianca aircraft. To be retired and replaced by Embraer E190 and A320.
Total	40	3		

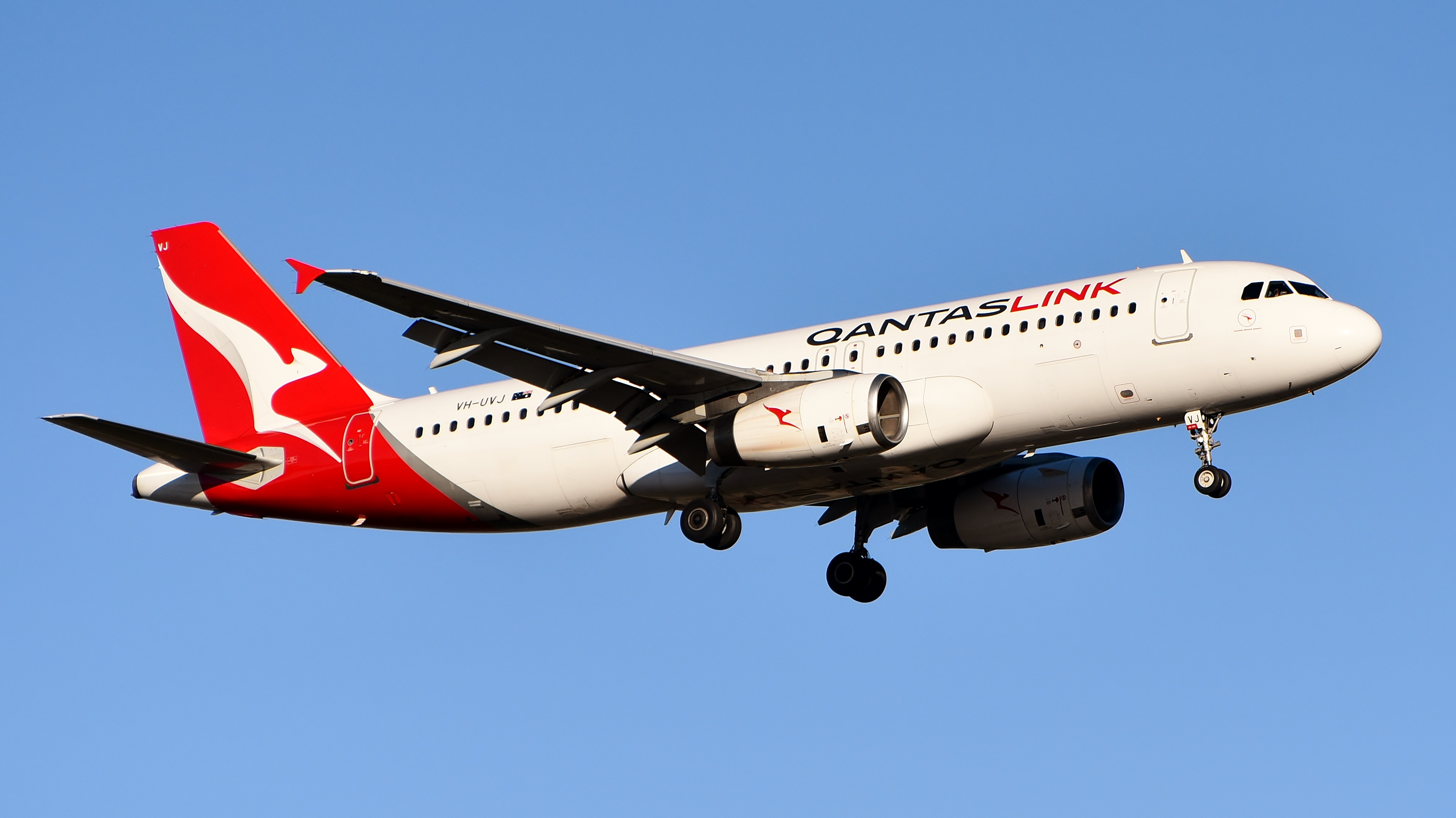
QantasLink Airbus A320-200

=== Formerly operated ===
Network Aviation formerly also operated the following types of aircraft:

- Beechcraft 200 Super King Air
- Cessna 310
- Cessna 441 Conquest II
- Embraer EMB-120ER Brasilia
