= Iron Bridge mine =

Iron ore mine in Western Australia

Iron Bridge Mine
- Location in Western Australia
- Interactive map of Iron Bridge Mine
- Location: Marble Bar, Pilbara, Western Australia, Australia; 21°16′S 119°02′E
- Products: Iron ore
- Production: 22 million tonnes/annum
- Opened: 2023
- Company: Fortescue
- Website: Fortescue website

The Iron Bridge mine is an iron ore mine which opened in 2023 in the Pilbara region of Western Australia, 145 km (90 mi) south of Port Hedland.

The mine is fully owned and operated by Fortescue and is one of several iron ore mines the company operates in the Pilbara, the others being Christmas Creek mine, Cloudbreak mine and the Kings Valley mine and Firetail mine at the Solomon Project.

== Background ==
The geology is banded iron formation with reserves of 716 million tonnes of iron ore.

== Construction ==
The project suffered from cost explosion, with the latest projection of $4.87 billion being 30 per cent higher than the original estimate. The workforce peaked at 4,000 jobs during construction. Around $330 million were awarded directly to local Traditional Custodian Nyamal businesses.

== Operation ==
The 12 grinding rolls use 93 MW to reduce the ore to 80 microns, and 10 grinding mills use 50 MW to further reduce to 35 microns. The powder at 0.028mm is mixed with water to slurry and sent by pipeline 135 km to Port Hedland.

The mine is connected to Fortesque's power grid, and got a 26 MW short-duration battery in 2023, stabilizing the grid. The 100 megawatt North Star Junction solar park opened in 2024 (15 km east of the Great Northern Highway and the Turner River), supplying some of the mine's power. A 50 MW / 250 MWh grid forming battery was ordered in late 2024 for the solar farm, and started operating in January 2026. Fortescue's Pilbara power grid is being expanded with 1.2 GW of solar capacity, 600 MW of wind generation and 4 GWh of storage.

The mine gets 25 billion liters of water per year from the Canning Basin, and also uses return water piped from Port Hedland.

The mine's workforce is around 900 on a fly-in fly-out roster. FIFO arrivals and departures take place at the mine's own airport with a 8,300 ft asphalt runway, 15 km west of the mine.
