= Fortescue Marshes =

Wetland in Pilbara region of Western Australia

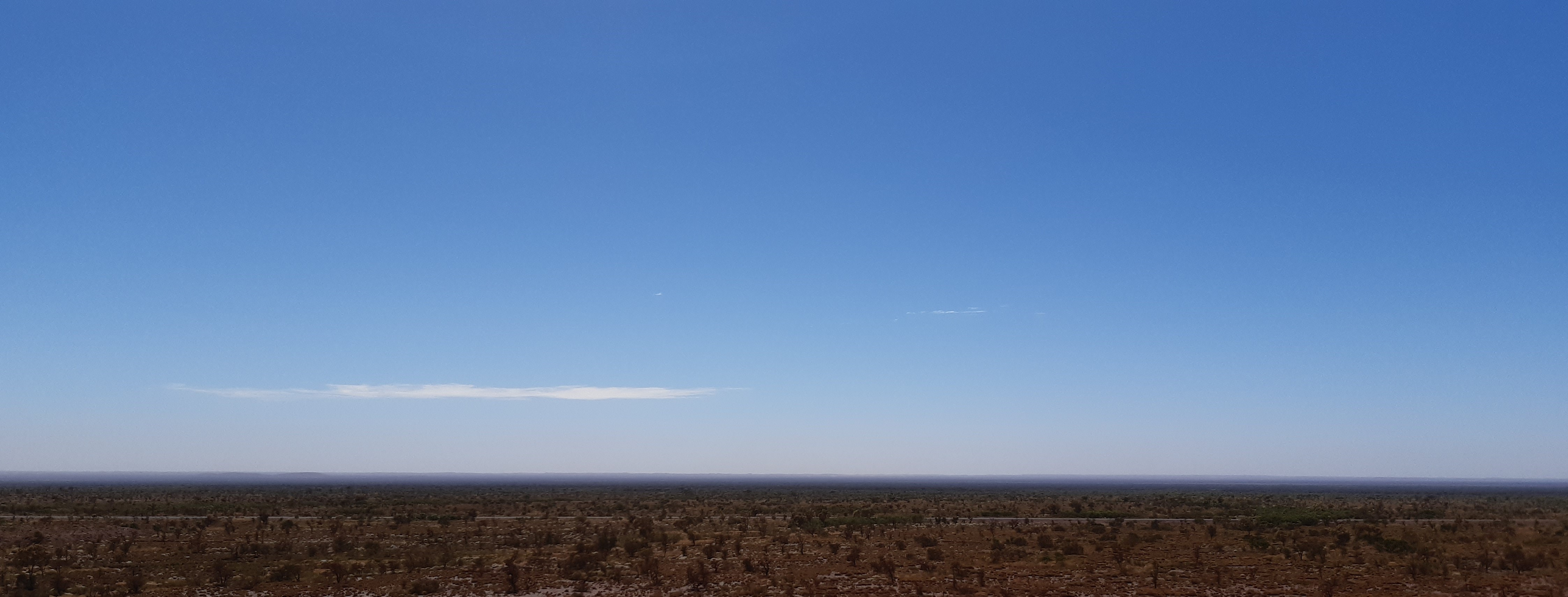
- The Fortescue Marshes seen from the south with the Munjina-Roy Hill Road in the foreground

- Location within Australia
- Interactive map of Fortescue Marshes
- Location: Pilbara, Western Australia
- Coordinates: 22°26′44″S 119°26′38″E
- Type: Marsh
- Basin countries: Australia

Fortescue Marsh (or marshes) is a part of the upper reaches of the Fortescue River in the Pilbara region of Western Australia.

The catchment area at the headwaters of the river is particularly flat and marshy where the Western Creek, Warrawanda Creek and Fortescue River converge, the river then flows through a poorly defined channel as far as Gregory Gorge when the river starts to form a well defined channel and flows through a number of pools before reaching the estuarine area.

== Important Bird Area ==
The 960 km^{2} (370 sq mi) Fortescue Marshes have been identified by BirdLife International as an Important Bird Area (IBA) because, when the area is flooded it supports up to 270,000 waterbirds, including over 1% of the world populations of 14 species. The site is also the location for one of the only two records made since 1990 of the critically endangered night parrot.

== Iron ore mining ==
The area is also within the range of iron ore mine operations, consisting of the Christmas Creek, Cloudbreak and Gudai-Darri mine.

The area is also regularly visited and issues assessed due to the sensitivity of the area and its geomorphology.

The operations include the Roy Hill mine and the Christmas Creek mine.
