= Eliwana mine =

Iron ore mine in the Pilbara region of Western Australia

- Location in Western Australia
- Interactive map of Eliwana mine
- Location: Shire of Ashburton, Pilbara, Western Australia, Australia; 22°28′16″S 116°49′40″E
- Products: Iron ore
- Production: 30 million tonnes/annum
- Opened: 2020
- Company: Fortescue Metals Group
- Website: Fortescue website

The Eliwana mine is an iron ore mine operated by the Fortescue Metals Group (FMG) and located in the Pilbara region of Western Australia, 90 km (56 mi) west of Tom Price. The mine forms the core of the company's Western Hub, one of three of its active mining areas, together with the Chichester Hub and the Solomon Hub.

== Overview ==
Iron ore mines in the Pilbara region

Iron ore exploration in the area by FMG commenced in 2006 on land traditionally owned by the indigenous Puutu Kunti Kurrama and Pinikura people.

By late 2016, FMG's Firetail mine, which produced high grade ore essential for blending with lower grade ore from other sides, was scheduled to be depleted by 2019. FMG approved the construction of the Eliwana mine in May 2018, reportedly to replace the Firetail mine.

Construction of the mine commenced in July 2019 at a projected cost of A$1.8 billion.

The mine was officially opened on 8 December 2020 by the Western Australian Minister for Mines and Petroleum, Bill Johnston. Operated by the Fortescue Metals Group, the mine is scheduled to produce 30 million tonnes of iron ore per annum. During the construction of the mine, approximately 2,000 people were employed, while, once in operation, this number dropped to 500.

A 143 km (89 mi) rail link, completed after the opening of the mine, connects Eliwana to the previously existing parts of the Fortescue railway. The railway line was eventually completed in March 2021.

The mine forms the core of the company's Western Hub, one of three of FMG's active mining areas as of 2022. Apart from the Western Hub, the company also mines the Chichester Hub, consisting of the Christmas Creek and Cloudbreak mines, and the Solomon Hub, consisting of the Firetail, Kings Valley and Queens Valley mines.

== See also ==
- Eliwana Camp Airport
