= Kings Valley mine (Western Australia) =

Iron ore mine in Western Australia

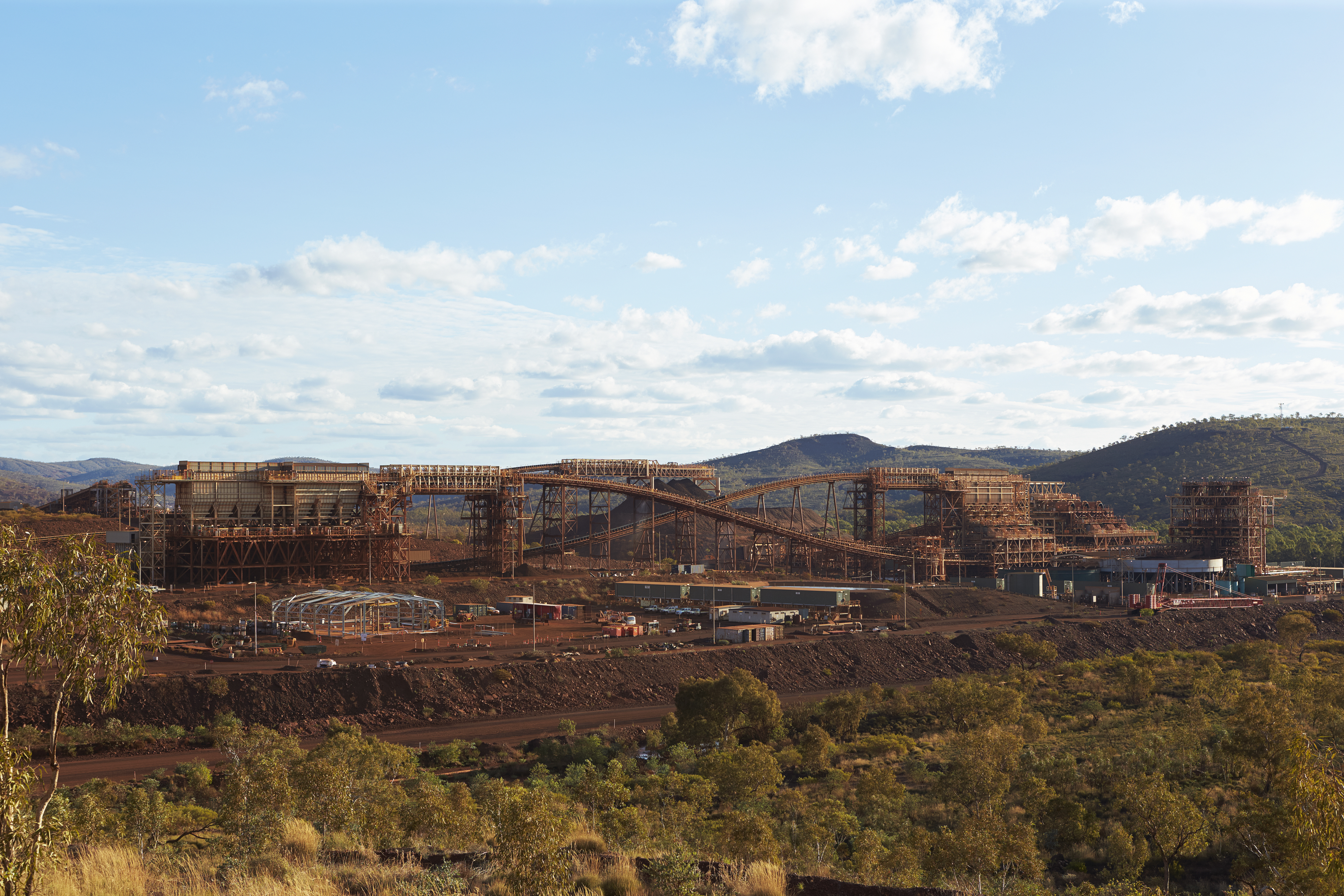
- FMG's Solomon hub

- Location in Western Australia
- Interactive map of Kings Valley mine
- Location: Shire of Ashburton, Pilbara, Western Australia, Australia; 22°07′14″S 117°52′38″E
- Products: Iron ore
- Production: 40 million tonnes/annum
- Opened: 2014
- Company: Fortescue Metals Group
- Website: https://www.fmgl.com.au/about-fortescue/our-operations

The Kings Valley mine is an iron ore mine operated by the Fortescue Metals Group (FMG) and located in the Pilbara region of Western Australia, 60 km (37 mi) north of Tom Price. The mine, along with Firetail mine, is part of the company's Solomon Hub, one of three FMG's mining areas, the others being the Chichester Hub and the Western Hub.

== Native title issues ==
Iron ore mines in the Pilbara region

The mine is located on the traditional land of the Yindjibarndi people, with the proposed mining at the Solomon hub leading to a long-standing dispute between the native title holders and the Fortescue Metals Group over compensation. The issue split the local community to a point where the Yindjibarndi Aboriginal Corporation rejected FMG's offers, which led to a rival group, the Wirlu-Murra Yindjibarndi Aboriginal Corporation, being formed, which chose to work with the mining company. The dispute was eventually settled in 2020, after 17 years of legal battle, when the High Court of Australia ruled in favour of the traditional owners, refusing the right of appeal to FMG.

However, in 2021 negotiations over an Indigenous Land Use Agreement failed, and as of May 2022 the Yindjibarndi Aboriginal Corporation is leading a native title compensation claim in the Federal Court, asserting that FMG have been mining on Yindjibarndi land without an agreement. According to the National Native Title Tribunal, the Federal Court needs to make a determination on whether the community is eligible for "compensation for the loss, impairment, diminution or extinguishment of native title rights and interests in the area".

== History of the mine ==
In March 2011, FMG lodged an application with the Environmental Protection Authority of Western Australia for approval of the Solomon iron ore project, consisting of the Kings Valley and Firetail mine, and 127 km (79 mi) of new railway line to connect the mines with the existing Fortescue railway. Mine life, at the time, was predicted to be 20 years with a combined production of 80 million tonnes of iron ore per annum.

While the nearby Firetail mine officially opened on 6 May 2013, the Kings Valley mine was opened on 28 March 2014. The mine, the second operation of the Solomon Hub, was scheduled to produce 40 million tonnes of iron ore per annum, while the Firetail mine was planned to produce half this amount for a projected total annual production for the hub of 60 million tonnes. The opening of the Kings Valley mine marked the end of $A9.96 billion expansion plan by Fortescue which had been ongoing since 2010 and expanded the company's production to 155 million tonnes of iron ore per annum.

A proposed three-fold expansion of the Solomon Hub mining area was approved by the Environmental Protection Authority in late 2016, despite long-standing opposition by the traditional owners of the land, the Yindjibarndi people, as well as concerns over the effects on the nearby Hammersley Gorge, located in Karijini National Park. The expansion was rejected by the Yindjibarndi Aboriginal Corporation but approved of by the rival Wirlu-Murra Yindjibarndi Aboriginal Corporation.

Mining at the Solomon Hub was temporarily suspended in late September 2021, after a fatality at one of the mines, when a male employee died in a ground collapse.

== Other mines ==
A third operation within the Solomon Hub, the Queens Valley mine, was approved for construction in 2019 at a projected cost of A$417 million. The mine, located 15 km (9.3 mi) west of the Kings Valley mine, is scheduled to open in 2022.

Apart from the Solomon Hub, as of March 2022, the company also mines the Chichester Hub, consisting of the Christmas Creek and Cloudbreak mines, and the Western Hub, consisting of the Eliwana mine.
