= Firetail mine =

Iron ore mine in the Pilbara region of Western Australia

- Location in Western Australia
- Interactive map of Firetail mine
- Location: Shire of Ashburton, Pilbara, Western Australia, Australia; 22°07′25″S 117°54′51″E
- Products: Iron ore
- Production: 27 million tonnes/annum
- Opened: 2013
- Company: Fortescue Metals Group
- Website: Fortescue website

The Firetail mine is an iron ore mine operated by the Fortescue Metals Group (FMG) and located in the Pilbara region of Western Australia, 60 km (37 mi) north of Tom Price. The mine is part of the company's Solomon Hub, one of three of its active mining areas, together with the Chichester Hub and the Western Hub.

Iron ore mines in the Pilbara region

== Native title issues ==
The mine is located on the traditional land of the Yindjibarndi people, with the proposed mining at the Solomon hub leading to a long-standing dispute between the native title holders and the Fortescue Metals Group over compensation. The issue split the local community to a point where the Yindjibarndi Aboriginal Corporation rejected FMG's offers, which led to a rival group, the Wirlu-Murra Yindjibarndi Aboriginal Corporation, being formed, which chose to work with the mining company. The dispute was eventually settled in 2020, after 17 years of legal battle, when the High Court of Australia ruled in favour of the traditional owners.

In March 2011, FMG lodged an application with the Environmental Protection Authority of Western Australia for approval of the Solomon iron ore project, consisting of the Firetail and Kings Valley mine, and 127 km (79 mi) of new railway line to connect the mines with the existing Fortescue railway. Mine life, at the time, was predicted to be 20 years with a combined production of 80 million tonnes of iron ore per annum.

A proposed three-fold expansion of the Solomon hub mining area was approved by the Environmental Protection Authority of Western Australia in late 2016, despite long-standing opposition by the traditional owners of the land, the Yindjibarndi people, as well as concerns over the effects on the nearby Hammersley Gorge, located in Karijini National Park. The expansion was rejected by the Yindjibarndi Aboriginal Corporation (YAC) but approved of by the rival Wirlu-Murra Yindjibarndi Aboriginal Corporation.

In 2017, the Federal Court of Australia recognised that the Yindjibarndi had exclusive native title rights over some 2,700 km^{2} (1,000 mi^{2}), and the court reaffirmed its decision in 2020 when FMG appealed to have the determination overturned. In 2022 the YAC asked the Federal Court to rule on compensation, after attempts to negotiate an Indigenous land use agreement had stalled. As of 2023 YAC continues its battle in the courts for compensation. They are seeking unpaid royalties of more than A$500 million, as well as damages that could amount to more hundreds of millions, for "loss of sacred sites and spiritual connection to the land". The claim was initially discussed at a meeting between FMC and YAC in March 2011. The Western Australian Government may also bear responsibility for allowing the mining to take place without the permission of the Yindjibarndi people. The lawyer acting for the YAC sees it as a landmark case, as it would be "the first case that sets down the benchmark for compensation to be paid under the Native Title Act by a miner".

== Mining operations ==
The Firetail mine officially opened on 6 May 2013 in the presence of Western Australian Minister for Mines and Petroleum, Bill Marmion. However, mining had commenced in late 2012 and first ore from the mine was railed to port in December 2012. The mine, as part of the company's new Solomon Hub, was scheduled to produce 20 million tonnes of iron ore per annum, while the nearby Kings Valley mine, under development at the time, was planned to produce double this amount for a projected total annual production for the hub of 60 million tonnes.

By late 2016, the Firetail mine had ramped up production to 27 million tonnes of iron ore per annum, producing high grade ore essential for blending with lower grade from other FMG mines, but was scheduled at the time to be depleted by 2019. In May 2018, FMG approved the construction of the Eliwana mine, reportedly to replace the Firetail mine.

Mining at the Solomon hub was temporarily suspended in late September 2021, after a fatality at one of the mines, when a male employee died in a ground collapse.

Apart from the Solomon Hub, as of 2022, the company also mines the Chichester Hub, consisting of the Christmas Creek and Cloudbreak mines, and the Western Hub, consisting of the Eliwana mine. A third operation within the Solomon hub, the Queens Valley mine, was approved for construction in 2019 at a projected cost of A$417 million. The mine, located 15 km (9.3 mi) west of the Kings Valley mine, is scheduled to open in 2022.
