= List of homesteads in Western Australia: R =

Homesteads by R

This list includes all homesteads in Western Australia with a gazetted name. It is complete with respect to the 1996 Gazetteer of Australia. Dubious names have been checked against the online 2004 data, and in all cases confirmed correct. However, if any homesteads have been gazetted or deleted since 1996, this list does not reflect these changes. Strictly speaking, Australian place names are gazetted in capital letters only; the names in this list have been converted to mixed case in accordance with normal capitalisation conventions.

Name	Location	Remarks
Radford Park	33°43′S 115°14′E	
Radford Park Stud	33°44′S 115°14′E	
Raesbrook	34°30′S 117°18′E	
Raffa	33°40′S 117°41′E	
Rafinlay	34°22′S 117°36′E	
Raheen	28°39′S 115°28′E	
Rainbow Downs	33°23′S 121°38′E	
Rainbow Valley	29°44′S 115°21′E	
Rainscourt	33°59′S 117°13′E	
Raintree	34°59′S 117°15′E	
Raluanda	33°46′S 115°57′E	
Ralvana	33°44′S 121°21′E	
Ramona	33°21′S 118°41′E	
Ranch	32°3′S 116°56′E	
Ranch Montana	34°40′S 118°16′E	
Ranelach	33°34′S 115°51′E	
Ranford Grange	33°39′S 117°43′E	
Ranfurly Park	30°44′S 116°1′E	
Range Lee	33°41′S 115°48′E	
Range Park	28°37′S 115°25′E	
Rangeview	31°43′S 116°31′E	
Rangeview	33°33′S 115°40′E	
Rangiora	33°29′S 115°39′E	
Rangitoto	33°46′S 122°43′E	
Rapanui	32°51′S 116°53′E	
Rathnally	30°51′S 116°31′E	
Ratio Downs	33°37′S 121°51′E	
Ravenhurst	33°15′S 117°8′E	
Ravenswood	33°43′S 115°13′E	
Rawlinna	31°2′S 125°13′E	
Raywood	29°50′S 116°10′E	
Reactor Lodge	17°54′S 122°13′E	
Red Gully	31°6′S 115°47′E	
Red Gums	34°29′S 117°34′E	
Red Hill	28°36′S 114°45′E	
Red Hill	33°37′S 117°26′E	
Red Hill	34°43′S 117°40′E	
Red Hill	32°37′S 118°1′E	
Red Hill	33°56′S 116°26′E	
Red Hill	21°59′S 116°4′E	
Red Hill	33°57′S 117°54′E	
Red Hills	33°21′S 117°0′E	
Red Knob Outstation	28°51′S 122°0′E	
Red Range	29°4′S 116°2′E	
Redgate	34°1′S 115°2′E	
Redhill	32°10′S 116°57′E	
Redlands	30°41′S 115°40′E	
Redlinch	31°14′S 115°46′E	
Redwing	31°8′S 116°55′E	
Reggio Calabria	33°51′S 115°48′E	
Reinscourt	33°39′S 115°23′E	
Relief Outcamp	24°35′S 118°15′E	
Remlap	33°6′S 115°44′E	
Remlap	30°8′S 117°34′E	
Remnah Park	33°43′S 115°22′E	
Remuera	31°37′S 116°59′E	
Renfrew	33°46′S 117°14′E	
Reommar	33°35′S 121°1′E	
Retreats End	31°35′S 115°41′E	
Rev De Pasy	33°27′S 115°36′E	
Reveille	32°25′S 116°43′E	
Reyndy Plains	29°31′S 115°22′E	
Rhoda Lea	33°31′S 121°52′E	
Rhonda Vale	34°18′S 118°9′E	
Ribblesdale	33°25′S 118°30′E	
Ribbleton	34°9′S 117°54′E	
Ricay Downs	32°17′S 118°29′E	
Richfields	33°41′S 120°42′E	
Ridgee	33°44′S 117°44′E	
Ridgefield	34°14′S 115°4′E	
Ridgelands	33°37′S 122°35′E	
Rinadena	33°51′S 117°31′E	
Ringamere	33°7′S 118°35′E	
Ringley Fold	33°52′S 117°51′E	
Ringmer	33°55′S 117°2′E	
Ringwood	33°45′S 121°34′E	
Riovista	32°46′S 115°54′E	
Ripplemead	33°51′S 117°17′E	
Risley	33°50′S 117°56′E	
Rivendell	33°41′S 115°14′E	
River Bend	33°17′S 116°9′E	
River Hill	34°16′S 117°20′E	
River Lea	32°20′S 115°54′E	
River Lodge	34°16′S 115°16′E	
River View	33°3′S 115°53′E	
Riverbend	34°8′S 115°11′E	
Riverbrook	31°18′S 115°36′E	
Riverdale	32°10′S 116°59′E	
Riverdale	33°39′S 117°17′E	
Riverdale	33°16′S 115°48′E	
Riverdale	34°55′S 117°59′E	
Riverdale	31°51′S 116°40′E	
Riverdell	33°21′S 118°58′E	
Riverina	33°15′S 115°49′E	
Riverina	29°45′S 120°34′E	
Riverina	33°36′S 115°37′E	
Riverlands	33°24′S 115°42′E	
Riverside	33°54′S 117°3′E	
Riverside	33°35′S 117°46′E	
Riverside	27°50′S 114°44′E	
Riverside	31°45′S 116°53′E	
Riverslea	33°31′S 116°52′E	
Rivervale	31°50′S 116°47′E	
Rivervale	33°40′S 115°12′E	
Rivervale	34°13′S 119°6′E	
Rivervale	33°32′S 115°33′E	
Riverview	33°18′S 115°45′E	
Rivettsfield	33°48′S 115°20′E	
Rivoli	31°47′S 116°43′E	
Roath Park	33°35′S 122°17′E	
Robertson Range	23°28′S 120°48′E	
Robin Hill	33°50′S 117°21′E	
Robin Outcamp	27°21′S 118°14′E	
Robindale	34°6′S 117°4′E	
Robindeer	34°4′S 118°35′E	
Rock Bank	33°37′S 115°52′E	
Rock Vale	31°59′S 118°14′E	
Rock View	33°34′S 117°30′E	
Rockdale	32°30′S 117°14′E	
Rockdale	34°58′S 117°1′E	
Rockdale	31°54′S 116°44′E	
Rockdale	29°25′S 116°6′E	
Rockdale	34°9′S 115°13′E	
Rockend	32°23′S 116°50′E	
Rockendale	31°43′S 116°58′E	
Rockhole	18°21′S 127°34′E	
Rocklands	32°27′S 117°4′E	
Rocklands	31°24′S 116°51′E	
Rocklea	22°53′S 117°27′E	
Rocklea	33°5′S 117°19′E	
Rocklea	32°52′S 118°25′E	
Rocklea	32°16′S 116°50′E	
Rocklea	33°4′S 116°54′E	
Rocklea Park	33°53′S 118°58′E	
Rocklee	33°16′S 119°49′E	
Rockleigh	33°23′S 121°20′E	
Rockleigh	33°24′S 117°12′E	
Rocklen	34°23′S 117°18′E	
Rockliffe	33°55′S 117°8′E	
Rocklyn View	33°31′S 117°31′E	
Rocklynn	33°57′S 116°16′E	
Rockton Farm	31°41′S 116°44′E	
Rockvale	31°32′S 116°46′E	
Rockvale	33°35′S 117°51′E	
Rockvale	34°45′S 117°20′E	
Rockvale	32°29′S 117°49′E	
Rockview	32°29′S 118°21′E	
Rockview	33°20′S 117°8′E	
Rockville	34°17′S 115°8′E	
Rockville	34°10′S 116°44′E	
Rockwell	34°16′S 117°32′E	
Rocky Creek	33°58′S 117°19′E	
Rocky Dale	32°49′S 117°7′E	
Rocky Ford	32°25′S 116°56′E	
Rocky Glen	33°54′S 116°57′E	
Rocky Grove	34°4′S 115°10′E	
Rocky Hill	32°19′S 116°50′E	
Rocky Ridge	31°11′S 116°8′E	
Rocky Ridge	33°45′S 115°16′E	
Rocky Spring	33°3′S 116°51′E	
Roderick Woolshed	27°2′S 116°58′E	
Roebuck Plains	17°56′S 122°28′E	
Rokewood	32°27′S 117°46′E	
Rokewood	33°51′S 115°55′E	
Rolling Acres	34°0′S 117°46′E	
Rolling Plains	33°52′S 115°4′E	
Rolyat	33°37′S 115°32′E	
Roma	33°4′S 115°53′E	
Roma Vineyards	33°55′S 117°26′E	
Romilly	32°20′S 116°36′E	
Romney Mar	33°32′S 115°56′E	
Rondalea	32°46′S 117°31′E	
Ronner Hills	29°55′S 116°26′E	
Ronola	34°19′S 117°34′E	
Rosa Pool	34°3′S 115°11′E	
Rosalie	33°18′S 115°48′E	
Rosamel	33°12′S 115°43′E	
Rosary	31°40′S 116°56′E	
Rose	31°11′S 116°11′E	
Rose Hill	33°56′S 117°39′E	
Rose Park	33°2′S 117°10′E	
Rose Valley	30°38′S 115°43′E	
Rose Valley	31°33′S 116°23′E	
Rose-dene	33°44′S 115°12′E	
Rosebrook	32°49′S 116°47′E	
Rosedale	33°19′S 115°49′E	
Rosedale	30°52′S 116°15′E	
Rosedale	34°1′S 117°50′E	
Rosedale	32°56′S 116°34′E	
Rosedale	33°52′S 117°53′E	
Rosedale	32°9′S 116°49′E	
Rosedale	33°37′S 116°32′E	
Roselea	33°11′S 118°58′E	
Roselea	33°24′S 115°42′E	
Roselie	33°4′S 115°49′E	
Roselyn	32°28′S 116°45′E	
Rosemount	33°52′S 117°0′E	
Rosendale	31°27′S 116°38′E	
Roseneath	32°6′S 116°48′E	
Rosevale	33°51′S 117°38′E	
Roseville	33°17′S 115°47′E	
Roseway	33°48′S 115°14′E	
Rosewood Farm	33°36′S 116°20′E	
Roslyn	33°57′S 117°3′E	
Roslyn	33°46′S 115°11′E	
Ross-lyn Plains	29°3′S 115°4′E	
Rossdale	31°25′S 116°47′E	
Rosslyn	34°1′S 115°11′E	
Rosslyn	33°51′S 118°0′E	
Rosslyn	32°36′S 116°56′E	
Rosslyn	33°44′S 117°42′E	
Rossmore	31°25′S 116°45′E	
Rothesay	33°32′S 118°41′E	
Rothesay	34°2′S 117°32′E	
Rouken-glen	33°12′S 116°49′E	
Roundwood	33°59′S 117°48′E	
Rout	34°15′S 118°17′E	
Rovade	33°39′S 122°19′E	
Rovie	33°12′S 117°9′E	
Rowanville	33°31′S 122°5′E	
Rowley Downs	30°55′S 115°54′E	
Rowley Park	34°10′S 119°15′E	
Roy Hill	22°37′S 119°57′E	
Royston	30°16′S 116°48′E	
Ruanui	33°57′S 117°0′E	
Ruby Plains	18°36′S 127°38′E	
Rudgyard	34°58′S 117°25′E	
Ruin Ridge	33°18′S 117°14′E	
Rumbalara	34°20′S 118°27′E	
Ruthven	34°26′S 117°19′E	
Rutland Gate	33°55′S 115°13′E	
Rye Park	34°10′S 118°57′E	
Ryelands	33°53′S 119°7′E	
Rylestone	33°46′S 117°30′E	
Rylington Park	34°2′S 116°31′E	

== See also ==
- List of pastoral leases in Western Australia
