= Fortescue Dave Forrest Airport =

Airport in Pilbara region of Western Australia

- IATA: KFE; ICAO: YFDF

Summary
- Operator: FMG Chichester Pty Ltd
- Elevation AMSL: 1,565 ft / 477 m
- Coordinates: 22°17′31″S 119°26′14″E

Map
- Location in Western Australia

Runways
Direction	Length		Surface
Direction	m	ft	Surface
12/30	2,300	7,546	Asphalt
- Sources: Australian AIP and aerodrome chart

Fortescue Dave Forrest Airport (IATA: KFE, ICAO: YFDF) is located about 5 km (3 mi) northeast of Fortescue's Cloud Break mine in Western Australia.

The airport is served by charter flights from airlines across Western Australia. The airport has the ability to land Airbus A320s and Boeing 737s, and has full baggage handling services. The open-air terminal buildings are around 500 m^{2} (5,400 sq ft) and do not have any security services in the terminal.

== Airlines and destinations ==
Airlines	Destinations
Network Aviation	Charter: Perth, Port Hedland
Qantas	Charter: Perth
QantasLink	Charter: Perth
