= Graeme Rowley Aerodrome =

Airport in Western Australia

- IATA: CKW; ICAO: YCHK

Summary
- Airport type: Private
- Owner/Operator: Fortescue
- Serves: Christmas Creek mine
- Elevation AMSL: 1,454 ft / 443 m
- Coordinates: 22°21′20″S 119°39′8″E

Map
- Location in Western Australia

Runways
Direction	Length		Surface
Direction	m	ft	Surface
09/27	2,500	8,202	Asphalt
- Sources: Australian AIP and aerodrome chart

Graeme Rowley Aerodrome (IATA: CKW, ICAO: YCHK) is located about 10 km northwest of Fortescue's Christmas Creek mine in Western Australia.

It is named after former Fortescue director Graeme Rowley.
