= Allery Sandy =

Australian artist

Allery Sandy is an artist from Roebourne, in Western Australia's Pilbara region, and a Yindjibarndi elder.

== Early life and work ==
Sandy was born in Roebourne to parents Sandy Andrews and Lila King. She is the fourth-eldest of their eleven children. Allery was first employed at the Community Welfare's second-hand clothes shop, and subsequently ran a play group for underprivileged children.

In 1986 Sandy started work as an Aboriginal Islander Education worker at Roebourne Pre-primary School, and from 1990 she taught the Yindjibarndi language as a LOTE (Languages Other Than English) subject. In 2001 Sandy left the school, and became involved women cooking and sewing, as well as the ministry of the local Aboriginal Church.

== Art ==
Sandy started painting in February 2006, following encouragement from a TAFE teacher, Patricia Floyd, who was giving lessons at the Pilbara Aboriginal Church in Roebourne. Sandy undertook courses in painting and design, and in 2007 completed her first painting with an aerial-perspective.

Sandy received national recognition as a finalist in the 2012 National Aboriginal & Torres Strait Islander Art Awards with her painting Country in Spring. Two years later she won top prize in the WA Indigenous section of the Cossack Art Awards.

Sandy was the subject and narrator of the documentary and slow TV show Marni, which aired on NITV on 23 January 2020. The title means marking in the Yindjibarndi language, and the 170 minute long feature shows Sandy as she creates a dot-work painting of the Roebourne region.

== Personal life and other roles ==
Sandy has three children, two daughters and a son.

In 2006 Sandy became the chairperson of Yinjaa-Barni Art, and in 2014 was a performer in, and Yindjibarndi language and cultural adviser for, the play "Hipbone Sticking Out".
