= Eliwana Camp Airport =

Airport in Western Australia

- IATA: WHB; ICAO: YEWA

Summary
- Airport type: Private
- Elevation AMSL: 1,576 ft / 480 m
- Coordinates: 22°25′42″S 116°53′16″E

Map
- Location of the airport in Western Australia

Runways
Direction	Length		Surface
Direction	m	ft	Surface
10/28	2,500	8,202	Asphalt
- Sources: Australian Aeronautical Information Publication

Eliwana Camp Airport (IATA: WHB, ICAO: YEWA) is an airport serving the Pilbara region of Western Australia. It might typically see 2 flights a day.

It provides logistic support for Eliwana mine.

== Airlines and destinations ==
Airlines	Destinations
QantasLink	Charter: Perth
