= Ginbata Airport =

Airport in Western Australia

- IATA: GBW; ICAO: YGIA

Summary
- Airport type: Private
- Owner: Roy Hill Holdings
- Operator: Roy Hill Holdings
- Location: Roy Hill Mine
- Elevation AMSL: 1,409 ft / 429 m
- Coordinates: 22°34′52″S 120°02′08″E

Map
- Location of the airport in Western Australia

Runways
| Direction | Length | | Surface |
| Direction | m | ft | Surface |
|---|---|---|---|
| 09/27 | 2,500 | 8,202 | Asphalt |
- Sources: Australian AIP

Ginbata Airport (IATA: GBW, ICAO: YGIA) is an airport serving the Roy Hill Minesite in the Pilbara region of Western Australia.

Charter services to the airport commenced on 13 August 2013.

== Airlines and destinations ==
| Airlines | Destinations |
|---|---|
| QantasLink | Charter: Perth |
| Qantas | Charter: Perth |

== See also ==
- List of airports in Western Australia
- Aviation transport in Australia
