= Fortescue railway line =

Private railway in Pilbara region of Western Australia

Fortescue railway
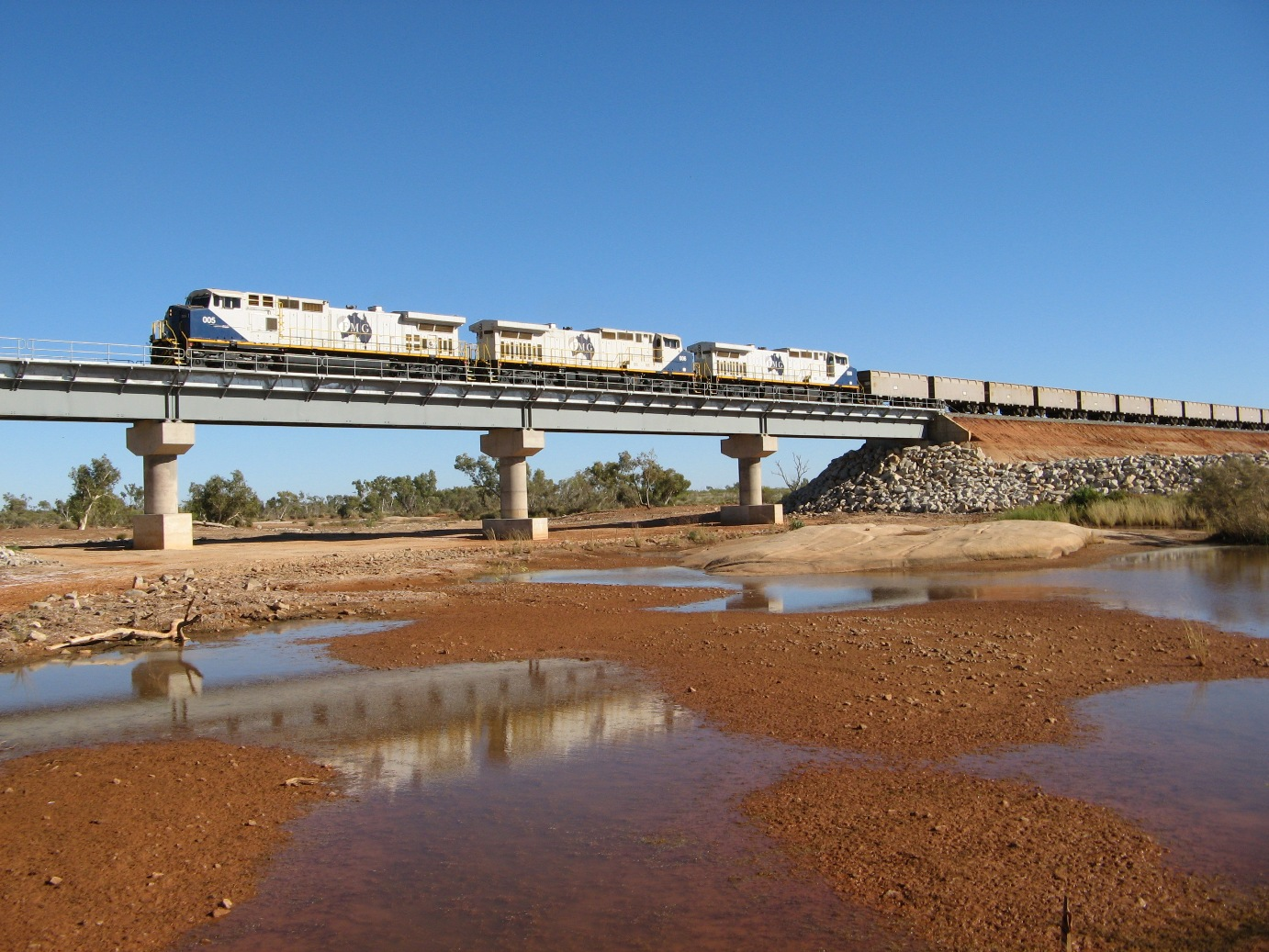
- Three GE Dash 9-44CWs haul a train across the Turner River in July 2008

Overview
- Status: Operational
- Locale: Pilbara, Western Australia
- Termini: Christmas Creek mine Cloud Break mine; Port Hedland

Service
- Type: Heavy rail
- System: Pilbara
- Operator: Fortescue Metals Group
- Depot: Thomas Yard

History
- Opened: 5 April 2008

Technical
- Line length: 620 km (385 mi)
- Track gauge: 1,435 mm (4 ft 8 1/2 in)
- Signalling: Train Order Working
- Train protection system: Positive Train Control

The Fortescue railway, owned and operated by Fortescue Metals Group (FMG), is a private rail network in the Pilbara region of Western Australia built to carry iron ore. It opened in 2008. When it was completed, it was the heaviest haul railway in the world, designed for 40 tonne axle loads, 2.5 to 5 tonnes heavier than the other Pilbara iron ore rail systems. On 4 November 2014, FMG Rail commenced trialling 42-tonne axle loads.

In addition to the FMG line, a number of other networks operate in the region. Rio Tinto operate the Hamersley & Robe River railway, BHP operates the Goldsworthy and Mount Newman railways and Hancock Prospecting the Roy Hill railway.

== History ==
Railways in the Pilbara region. The Fortescue railroad is in blue .

FMG originally planned to use the existing railway lines, owned and operated by BHP and Rio Tinto, to develop its Cloud Break mine deposit. Lengthy legal battles however forced the company to spend A$2.5 billion to construct its own line.

Construction on the 280 km (170 mi) line from the Cloud Break mine to the Herb Elliott Port at Port Hedland commenced in November 2006. The current network consists of 620 kilometres (390 miles) of track. The line was scheduled to be fully operational within 18 months, but a cyclone in March 2007 killed two workers at the project and led to delays. The first train from the mine to the port ran on 5 April 2008. In December 2012, the line was extended to the new Solomon Mine.

The journey from mine to port takes approximately five hours, and on average fourteen trains are operated per day. The line is open-access, meaning Fortescue is willing to allow other mining companies to use it for their operations.

== BHP and Rio Tinto railway use ==
Before deciding to construct its own line, in June 2004 FMG lodged an application with the National Competition Council of Australia to use part of the Goldsworthy and Mount Newman railways.

In June 2010, the Australian Competition Tribunal ruled that FMG be granted access to Rio Tinto's Robe River line and BHP's Billiton's Goldsworthy line but not to the busier Hamersley and Mount Newman lines. Treasurer Wayne Swan suggested that several advantages would accrue from access to the rail lines by third parties. It would increase competition, reduce duplication of infrastructure, and reduce environmental damage.

Access to the rail networks by third parties is governed by the State Agreements Act.

In November 2010, BC Iron became the first mining company to access a Pilbara network via a third party agreement.

== Rolling stock ==
To operate construction trains, four ex-Hamersley & Robe River railway C-636Rs were leased from Coote Industrial after overhaul in Perth, and a former Kowloon-Canton Railway EMD G12 locomotive leased from Chicago Freight Car Leasing Australia. As at February 2015, FMG operated 45 locomotives and 3,244 iron ore wagons.

As at October 2014, the locomotive fleet comprises 21 Electro-Motive Diesel SD70ACess 15 GE Dash 9-44CWs and nine former Union Pacific Railroad Electro Motive Diesel SD90s that were converted to SD70ACes. Seven rebuilt Union Pacific Railroad EMD SD90MAC-Hs Phase IIs were in transit from the United States.

The 54 locomotives of Fortescue's rail operations burned 82 million litres of diesel in FY21, making up 11% of the company’s emissions. To hit net zero by 2030, Fortescue needs a revolutionary solution to eliminate diesel use in the rail fleet.

== Infinity train battery locomotives ==
In Péry, Switzerland, a Komatsu Limited HD 605-7 mining dumper transports 65 tons of mined Limestone rock downhill from the mountain. Converted to battery electric drivetrain as 45-ton "eDumper", its regenerative braking generates enough electricity as it descends to return to the mountain top after it was unloaded at the bottom. The eDumper uses less electricity than it produces.

Fortescue has a similar but much larger situation. The trains run loaded from the mountains to sea level, and are empty on the way back. Each of 16 train sets is about 2.8 kilometres in length and has the capacity to haul 34,404 tonnes of iron ore in 244 ore cars.

With regenerative braking of battery electric locomotives, the "Infinity Train" concept uses the energy produced on downhill sections of the rail network to recharge its battery systems, making the train entirely self-sufficient on its return trip to reload. This eliminates the need for external recharging or additional renewable energy.

The first gravity locomotive was converted from the GE Dash 9-44CW unit with serial number #50708 from August 1998, formerly BNSF 4854 and GECX 4854. It was sold to Fortescue Metals Group and sent to Gemco Rail Perth in November 2022, and was delivered by road to FMG Thomas Yard in June 2025.
