= Turner River =

River in Western Australia

Coordinates: 20°22′31″S 118°21′54″E

Location
- Country: Australia

Physical characteristics
- Source
  - location: Pullcunah Hill
  - elevation: 253 m (830 ft)
- Mouth
  - location: Indian Ocean
  - elevation: sea level
- Length: 236 km (147 mi)
- Basin size: 4,555 km^{2} (1,759 sq mi)

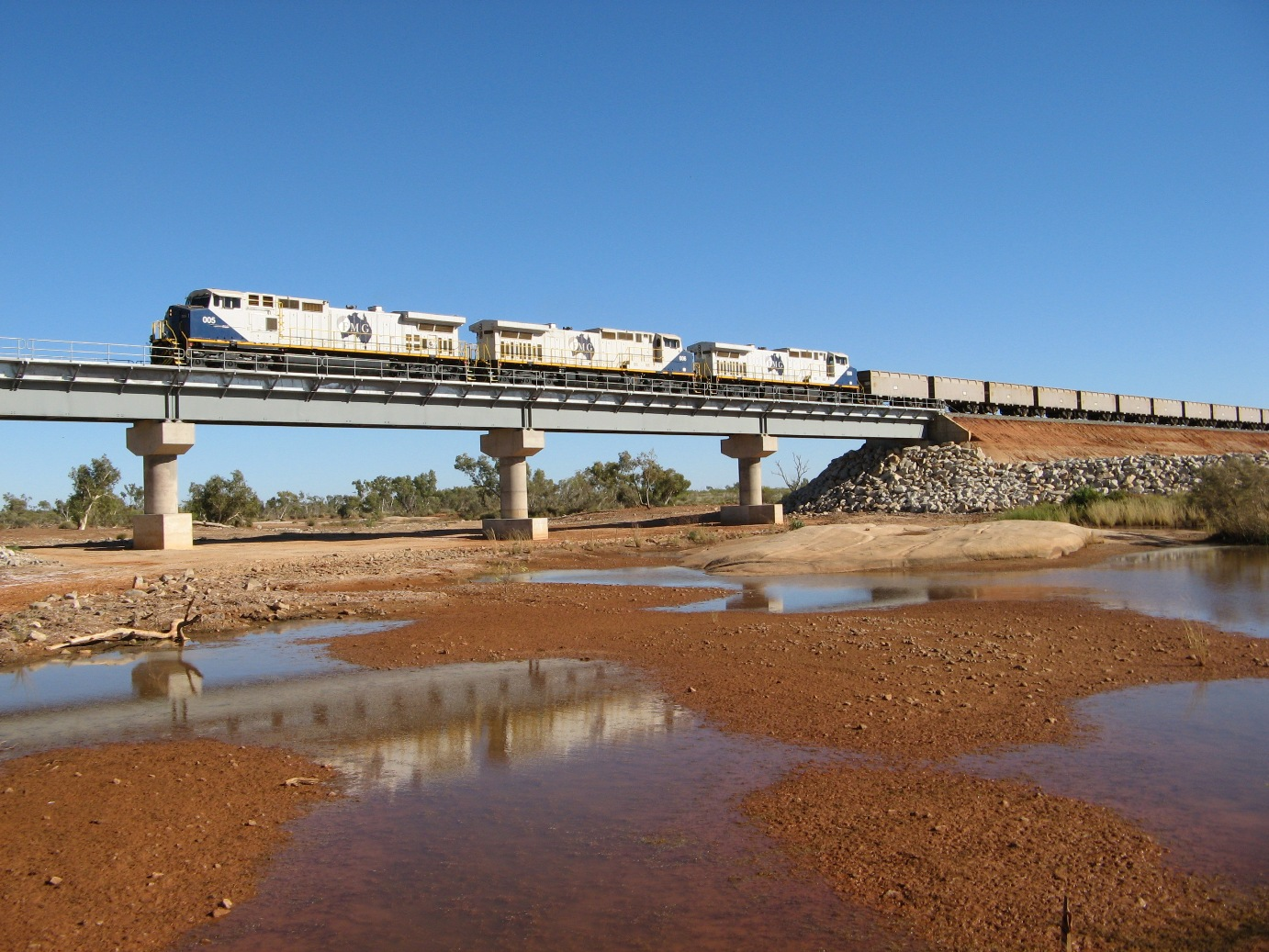
FMG iron ore train crossing over the Turner River

The Turner River is a river in the Pilbara region of Western Australia.

== Overview ==
The headwaters of the river rise below Pullcunah Hill and flows in a northerly direction and crosses the North West Coastal Highway approximately 40 kilometres (25 mi) south of Port Hedland and discharging into the Indian Ocean. The riverbed is alluvial and highly braided.

The river has three tributaries: Turner River East, Turner River West and Red Creek. It also flows through two large permanent pools, Kunagunarinna Pool and Moorambine Pool.

The mouth of the river is a large estuarine area that is mostly unmodified. The estuary functions primarily as a result of tidal energy. It covers a total area of 9.1 square kilometres (4 sq mi), which is mostly made up of salt-marsh with a small colony of mangroves.

Much of the river catchment is used for cattle (grazing); excess nutrients cause some eutrophication in some pools upstream. Some mining also occurs within the catchment area.

In 1952 Lang Hancock flew his plane low through the gorges in the Turner River to escape bad weather when he noticed the red ochre colouration of the rocks and thought it could be a significant deposit of iron ore. He later returned to collect samples which he duly had tested and discovered he had found a huge deposit of high-grade ore.
