= Fortescue River =

River in the Pilbara, Western Australia

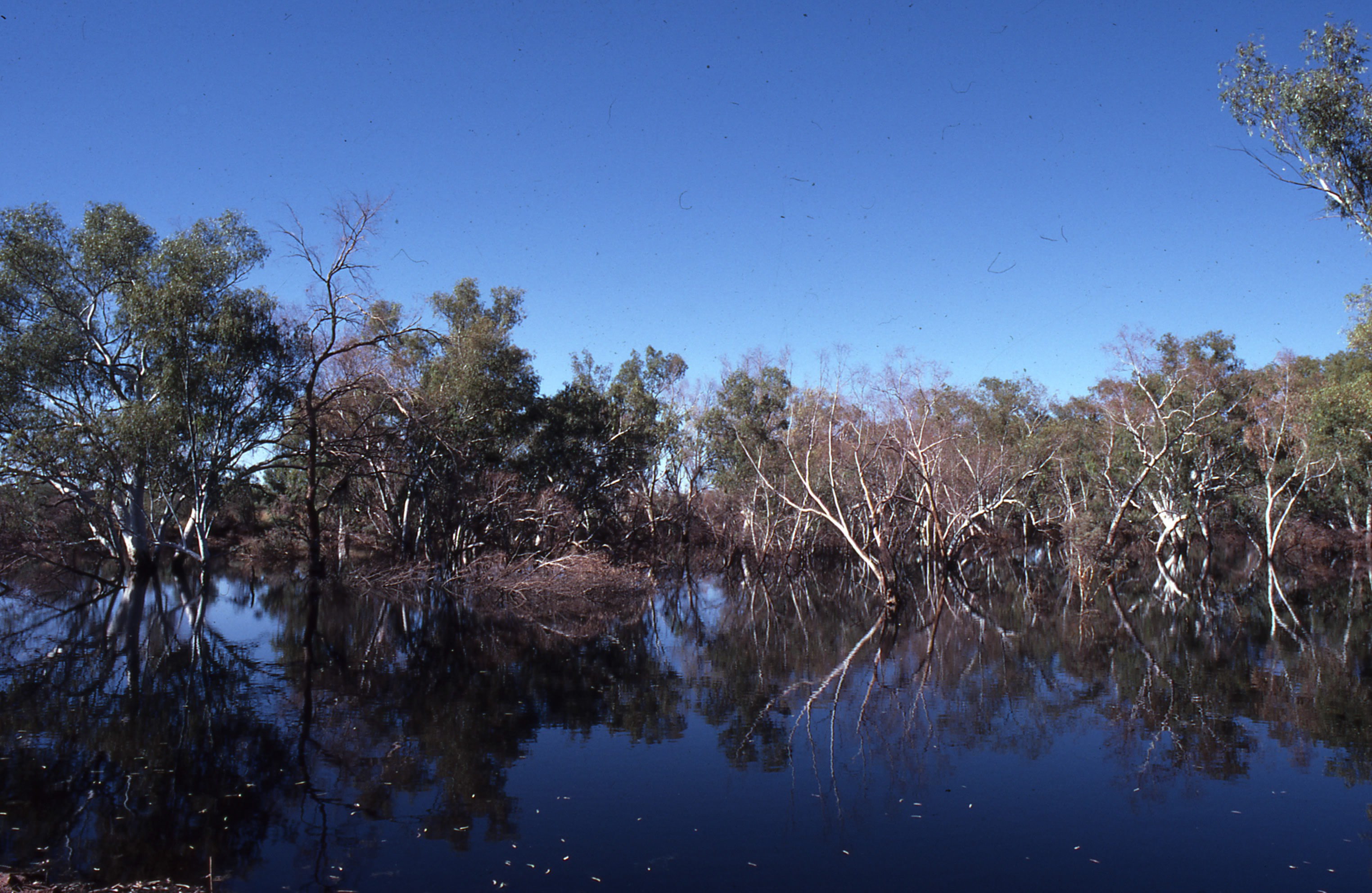
- Ophthalmia Dam, Fortescue River

Location
- Country: Australia

Physical characteristics
- Source
  - location: Ophthalmia Range
  - elevation: 602 metres (1,975 ft)
- Mouth
  - location: Indian Ocean
- Length: 760 kilometres (472 mi)
- Basin size: 49,759 square kilometres (19,212 sq mi)
- Discharge
  - average: 391 GL/a (12.4 m^{3}/s; 438 cu ft/s) (mean)

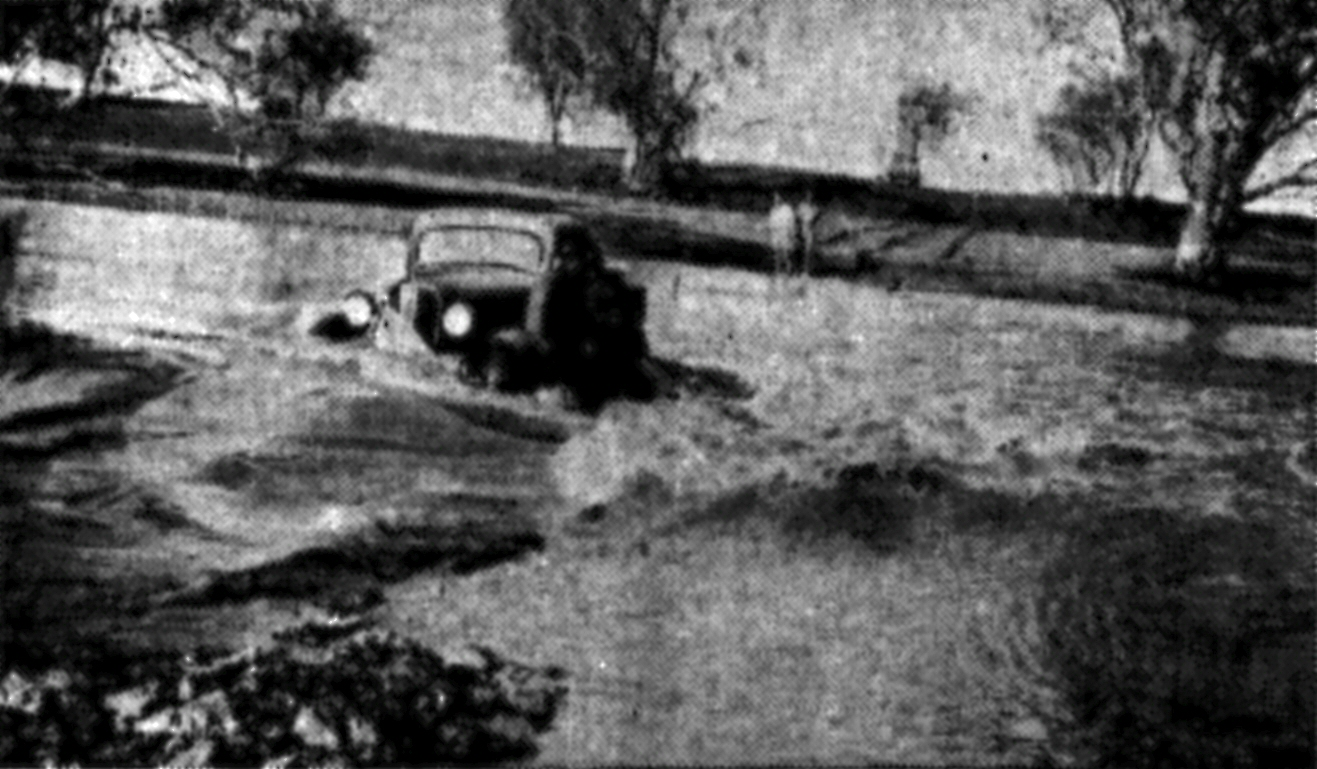
Fortescue in flood 1942

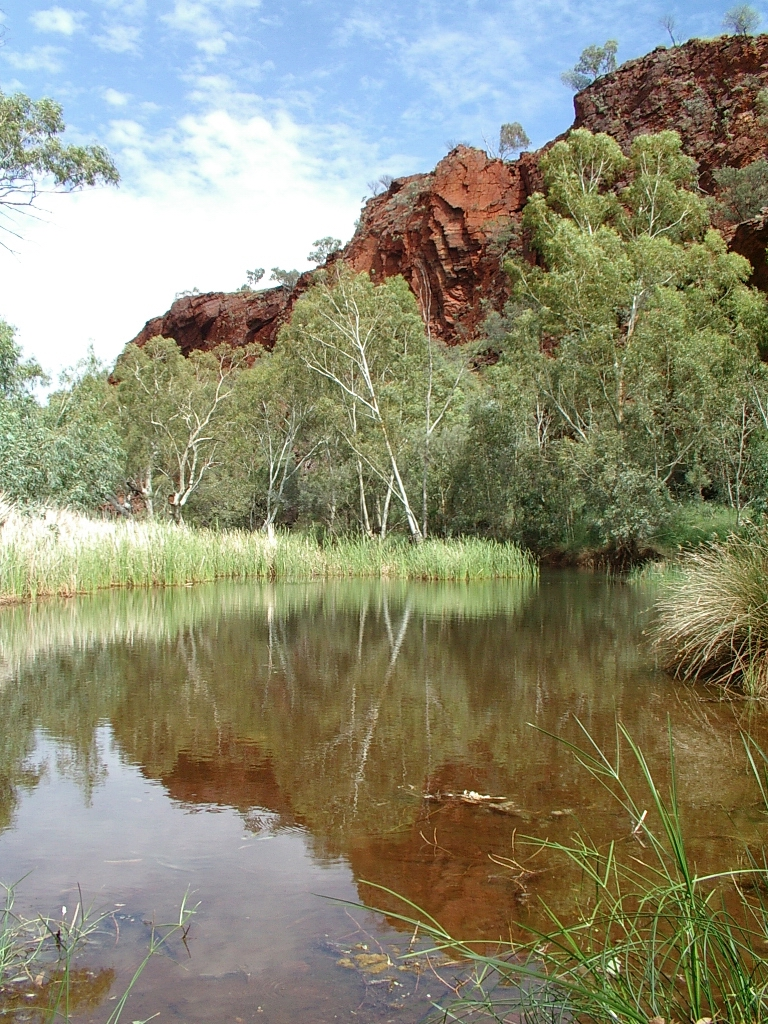
Kalgans Pool near Newman

The Fortescue River is an ephemeral river in the Pilbara region of Western Australia. It is the third longest river in the state.

== Course ==
The river rises near Deadman Hill in the Ophthalmia Range about 30 km south of Newman. The river flows in a northerly direction parallel with the Great Northern Highway until it crosses the highway just south of the Marble Bar turn-off. The river then runs north-west then west crossing the Great Northern Highway again, north of the Auski Roadhouse. Approximately 100 kilometres (62 mi) north of Newman, the river flows through the 960 square kilometres (371 sq mi) Fortescue Marsh, an important wetland. The river continues to head west crossing Highway 1 at the Fortescue Roadhouse (21°17′44.32″S 116°08′17.52″E) and discharges into the Indian Ocean at Mardie Station about 40 km south-west of Dampier.

== Tributaries ==
The river is known to have 24 tributaries that include: Western Creek, Warrawanda Creek, Shovelanna Creek, Kalgan Creek, Fortescue River South, Cowcumba Creek, Macklin Creek and Tanga Tanga Creek.

During Cyclone Joan in 1975 many of these tributaries also flooded. Weeli Wolli Creek and Weelumurra Creek both overflowed and caused floods and washaways on the Hamersley Iron and Mount Newman railway lines.

The river flows through a number of permanent water pools on the latter part of its journey including Tarda Pool, Mungowarra Pool, Crossing Pool and Deep Reach Pool.

== Catchment ==
The Fortescue Catchment area drains from the southern side of the Chichester Plateau and the northern side of the Hamersley Range making use of the trough between the two. The valley plains are composed of earthy clays with some cracking clays, loams and hard red soils.

Water is stored at Ophthalmia Dam which holds a total volume of 32,000ML, and a total of 6,290 ML/year are drawn from the surface water for use in the town of Newman.

=== Fortescue Marshes ===
See also Fortescue Marshes

The headwaters area of Fortescue River is flat and marshy. It is a location where Western Creek, Warrawanda Creek and Fortescue River converge.

The river then flows through a poorly defined channel as far as Gregory Gorge, when the river starts to form a well defined channel. It then flows through a number of pools before reaching the estuarine area.

== Estuary ==
The mouth of the river is a large estuarine area. The estuary is mostly unmodified, and functions primarily as a result of river energy. The delta formed by the river is tide dominated. The estuary covers a total surface area of 23.3 square kilometres (9 sq mi) The majority of the estuarine area is made up of salt marsh and intertidal flats. A colony of mangroves use the estuary as habitat and occupy an area of 1.2 square kilometres (0.5 sq mi). Large female barramundi are known to inhabit the estuary.

== History ==
The river was named in 1861 during an expedition by the explorer and surveyor Francis Thomas Gregory, after Chichester Fortescue, Parliamentary Under-Secretary of State for the Colonies.

The traditional owners of some of the area that the river flows through are the Indjibandi people.

Mardie Station, at the western end of the river, was established prior to 1883. Three paddocks were fenced, and by that year were carrying about 18,000 sheep.

Roy Hill Station, much further inland, was settled in 1886 by Nat Cooke who owned Mallina Station. The first official lease was granted to D. MacKay in 1890 for an area of 20,000 acres (8,094 ha).

A 69-metre (226 ft) bridge crossing the river near the station was constructed in the late 1920s to service the cattle industry.

== Damming proposals ==
The river has been surveyed and proposed as a site for dams, in the Gregory Gorge and the Dogger Gorge as well as Ophthalmia.
