= Yindjibarndi people =

Indigenous people of Western Australia

The Yindjibarndi are an Aboriginal Australian people of the Pilbara region of Western Australia. They form the majority of Aboriginal people around Roebourne (the Millstream area). Their traditional lands lie around the Fortescue River. Since 1998 the Yindjibarndi people had a land access agreement with the Woodside-operated North West Shelf Venture, to allow access to part of their traditional lands for the purpose of mining. In 2017, the Federal Court of Australia recognised that the Yindjibarndi had exclusive native title rights over the area. A court case for compensation begun in 2022 eventually led to the decision in the Federal Court on 12 May 2026, awarding approximately A$150 million for cultural loss and around A$100,000 for economic loss, making it the largest native title compensation award in Australian history.

== Language ==
Yindjibarndi, with around 1,000 speakers, has been called the most innovative descendant of then proto-Ngayarta language. It is mutually intelligible with Kurruma. Due to their displacement in the colonisation process, which forced them into Roebourne, many speakers are Ngarluma people who have adopted Yindjibarndi. Their spatial concepts regarding landscape of do not translate with any equivalent conceptual extension into English.

== Country ==
Yindjibarndi ancestral territory has been estimated to cover approximately 13,000 square kilometres (5,000 mi^{2}). It is located on the lower Hamersley Range plateau south of the Pialin at the junction of Portland Creek with the Fortescue River, east along a line formed by the edge of the scarp facing the eastern headwaters of Yule River; east along the Fortescue River to Marana Pool, about 16 km (10 mi) west of Kudaidari; south to the clifflike north-facing scarp of the higher Hamersley Range plateau, roughly along a line from Mount Elvira east-southeast to Mount George. The southern boundary is marked by the change from open porcupine grass country to the densely thicketed mulga country extending south.

They form the majority of Aboriginal people around Roebourne (the Millstream area).

== Ecology ==
Traditionally, until the arrival of Europeans, the Yindjibarndi lived along the middle sector of the valley through which the Fortescue River runs, and the nearby uplands. Beginning in the 1860s pastoralists established cattle stations on their homeland, and the Yindjibarndi were herded into settlements. Today most of them are congregated in and around the traditional Ngarluma territory whose centre is Roebourne.

== Native title ==
The Yindjibardni people, alongside the Ngarluma people, are a party to the land access agreement for the Woodside-operated North West Shelf Venture, executed in 1998. Under the agreement, Ngarluma and Yindjibarndi people remain the traditional owner representatives for the North West Shelf Venture area, which includes the Karratha Gas Plant. The 1998 agreement established the Ngarluma Yindjibarndi Foundation Ltd (NYFL), (Note: In2026, headed by Sean-Paul Stephens.) which operates out of Roebourne. The Yindjibarndi Aboriginal Corporation (YAC) and the Yindjibarndi Ngurra Aboriginal Corporation (YNAC) are the two prescribed bodies corporate that deal with matters of native title.

In 2003, the Yindjibardni people lodged a native title claim The mining magnate Andrew Forrest, head of Fortescue Metals Group (FMG), which extracts ore at the Solomon iron ore hub on the Yindjibarndi's traditional land, waged a 16-year legal battle to assert the company's rights over use of the land. However, in 2017, the Federal Court of Australia recognised that the Yindjibarndi had exclusive native title rights over some 2,700 square kilometres (1,000 mi^{2}), and the court reaffirmed its decision in 2020 when FMG appealed to have the determination overturned.

In 2022 the YNAC asked the Federal Court to rule on compensation, after attempts to negotiate an Indigenous land use agreement had stalled. They sought unpaid royalties of more than A$500 million, as well as damages that could amount to more hundreds of millions, for "loss of sacred sites and spiritual connection to the land". The claim was initially discussed at a meeting between FMG and YAC in March 2011. The lawyer acting for the YNAC saw it as a landmark case, as it had the potential to be "the first case that sets down the benchmark for compensation to be paid under the Native Title Act by a miner".

The legal process continued until 2026, when Justice Stephen Burley of the Federal Court delivered a landmark decision in Yindjibarndi Ngurra Aboriginal Corporation RNTBC v State of Western Australia (No 2) [2026] FCA 585 on 12 May 2026, awarding approximately $150 million for cultural loss and around $100,000 for economic loss, making it the largest native title compensation award in Australian history. Burley noted that 240 sacred sites inside the Solomon Hub mining area had become inaccessible to the Yindjibarndi people, and 124 of them had been obliterated by the mining excavations. The Court found that significant cultural and spiritual harm had occurred as a result of mining activities, including impacts on Yindjibarndi connection to ngurra (Country).

The decision attracted national attention and prompted debate about the adequacy of native title compensation laws in Australia. YNAC described aspects of the ruling as unsatisfactory, particularly the limited amount awarded for economic loss compared with the scale of wealth generated by the Solomon Hub mine. Following the ruling, Yindjibarndi leaders indicated they were considering an appeal, including the possibility of taking aspects of the matter to the High Court of Australia.

== Notable Yindjibarndi people ==
- Michael Woodley, CEO of YAC, YNAC, and Yindjibarndi Nation Ltd (YNL), Woodley is the main subject of the book Title Fight (2021) by journalist Paul Cleary. In 2026, Business News named Michael Woodley as the 3rd most powerful person doing business in Australia's north west.
- Tootsie Daniel (dec.), Aboriginal Rights activist and artist. Following her death, T. Daniel was remembered as the “Queen of Roebourne”. Upon her death, Ngarluma Yindjibarndi Foundation CEO Sean-Paul Stephens told the ABC: "I truly believe that First Nations rights in this part of the world wouldn't have advanced to the place they are without Tootsie". Daniel was also remembered for giving evidence as part of the Yindjibarndi vs Fortescue land rights legal case, and for speaking out against industrial impacts to the Murujuga Cultural Landscape.
- Allery Sandy, artist
- Gemma Houghton, Australian rules footballer
- Jody Broun, former CEO of the National Indigenous Australians Agency (NIAA)
- Lorraine Coppin, CEO Juluwarlu Aboriginal Corporation, who jointly led the redevelopment of the Ganalili Cultural Centre in Roebourne
- Wendy Hubert, artist
- Alice Guiness, artist
