= Cloudbreak mine =

Iron ore mine in Western Australia

Cloudbreak Mine
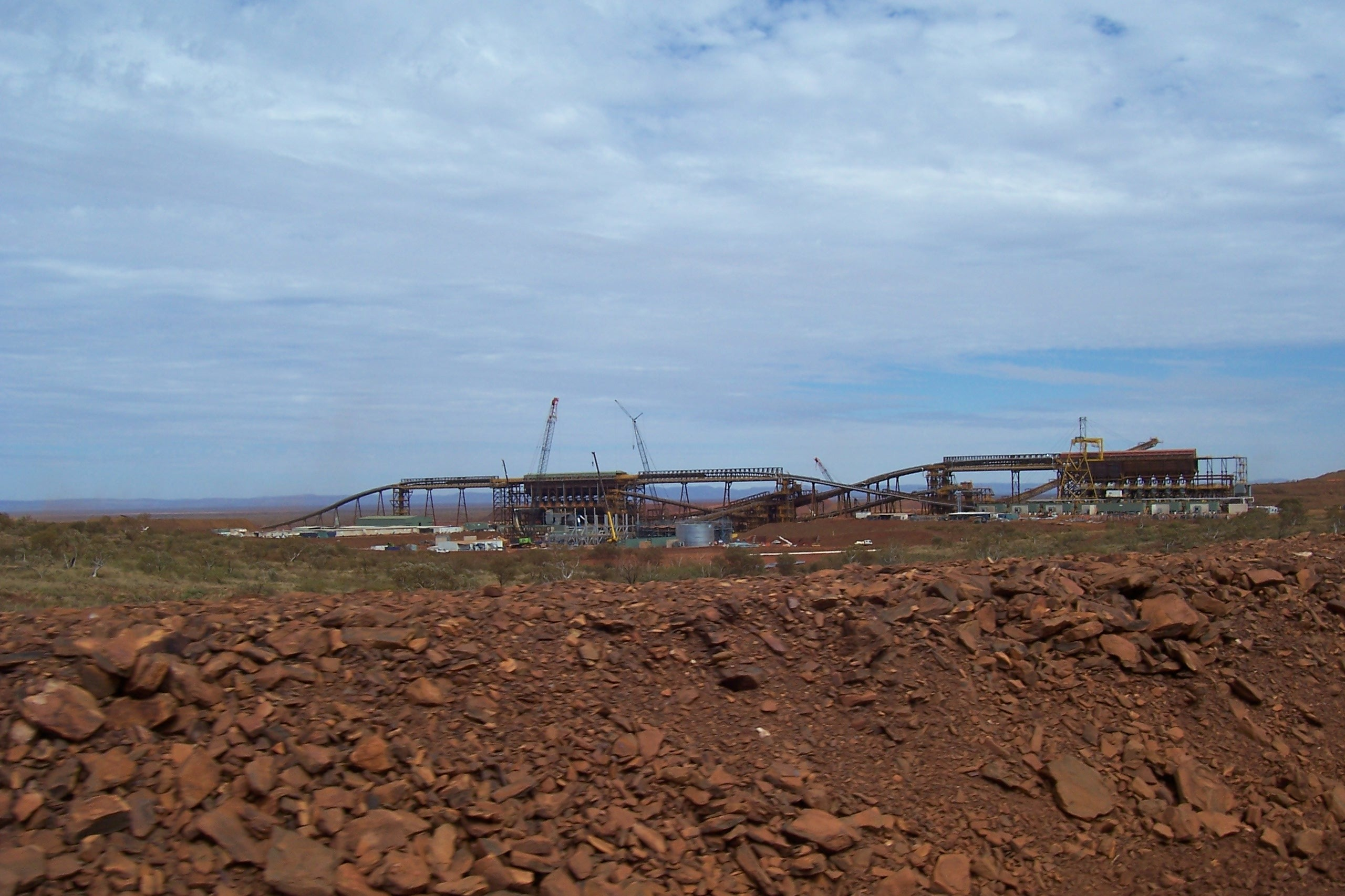
- Cloudbreak Mine in distance - 2008

- Location in Western Australia
- Interactive map of Cloudbreak Mine
- Location: Shire of Ashburton, Pilbara, Western Australia, Australia; 22°19′26″S 119°23′49″E
- Products: Iron ore
- Production: 40 million tonnes/annum
- Opened: 2008
- Company: Fortescue Metals Group
- Website: Fortescue website

The Cloudbreak mine is an iron ore mine located in the Pilbara region of Western Australia, 89 km (55 mi) west-south-west of Nullagine, in the Chichester Range.

The mine is fully owned and operated by the Fortescue Metals Group (FMG) and is one of four iron ore mines the company operates in the Pilbara, the others being Christmas Creek mine (50 km (31 mi) east of Cloudbreak) and the Kings Valley mine and Firetail mine at the Solomon Project.

FMG is the third-largest iron ore mining company in the Pilbara, behind Rio Tinto and BHP.

The mine is situated within the boundaries of Mulga Downs Station, which is owned by Gina Rinehart.

== Overview ==
Iron ore mines in the Pilbara region

FMG acquired the Cloudbreak and Christmas Creek tenements during 2003. The company began constructing port facilities at Port Hedland in February 2006, followed by a $3.2 billion capital raising in August 2006 to finance its projects. Construction on the mine itself began in October 2006.

Fortescue began mining at Cloudbreak in October 2007. Iron ore production at the mine began in 2008 and in its first full year of operation the mine produced 28 million tonnes of iron ore.

The ore from the mine is processed on site before being loaded onto rail. The product is then transported to the coast at Port Hedland via the Fortescue railway, where it is loaded onto ships. Construction on the 280 km (170 mi) long line from Cloudbreak to the Herb Elliott Port at Port Hedland began in November 2006. The line was scheduled to be fully operational within 18 months. A cyclone in March 2007 killed two workers at the project and lead to delays. The first train from the mine to the port travelled on 5 April 2008.

The mine's workforce is on a fly-in fly-out roster. FIFO arrivals and departures take place at Fortescue Dave Forrest Airport, approximately 5 kilometres (3 mi) away.

The hubs' (Cloudbreak and Chichester combined) annual production rate, as of January 2013, is 90 million tonnes of iron ore. Instead, Fortescue decided to develop its Christmas Creek deposit, at a cost of US$360 million, by building a mine and process plant there and linking it to its existing rail network. Christmas Creek is scheduled to produce 16 million tonnes of iron ore in its first year of operation. Fortescue plans to reach an annual production of 95 million tonnes of iron ore by 2012, downgraded from an earlier target of 120 million.

Mining at Cloudbreak was temporarily suspended on 24 December 2010 after a fatality as a sign of respect and to ensure the safety of the workers.

Approximately 1,500 workers at the mine had to be evacuated in October 2013 after a large bushfire threatened the accommodation village near the mine. The workers were taken to Christmas Creek mine until the danger had passed. No injuries or damage was caused to the minesite by the fire which was eventually contained.

In 2025 FMG began building a 190 MW solar park near the mine.

== Environmental approval ==
The approval of the A$2 billion project through the Minister for the Environment, Ian Campbell, was criticised because of a number of endangered species in the area of the future mine, among them the rare night parrot. Continuation of the mining project was endangered and to gain EPA approval the mine had to implement a management plan to ensure that mining activities would not have a negative effect on the species' survival in the area. The occurrence of the night parrot in the future mining area was discovered during a 2005 survey, at Minga Well on 12 April 2005, commissioned by FMG, which was carried out by two contract biologists who sighted a small group of the birds. Unconfirmed sightings of the bird had been made previously in a nearby area in 2004.
