= Roy Hill mine =

Iron ore mine in Western Australia

- Location in Western Australia
- Interactive map of Roy Hill mine
- Location: Chichester Range, Shire of East Pilbara, Pilbara, Western Australia, Australia; 22°37′19″S 119°57′30″E
- Products: Iron ore
- Production: 60 million tonnes per annum
- Opened: 2015
- Company: Hancock Prospecting (70%); POSCO (12.5%); Marubeni (15%); China Steel Corporation (2.5%)
- Website: www.royhill.com.au

The Roy Hill mine is an iron ore mine in the Chichester Range in the Pilbara region of Western Australia, located 115 kilometres (71 mi) north of Newman and 277 kilometres (172 mi) south of Port Hedland. With indicated and inferred reserves of more than 2.4 billion tonnes, it is expected to become one of the largest mining projects in Australia. Mining operations are expected to produce up to 55 million tonnes of iron ore per annum with an operating life of more than 20 years.

Gina Rinehart's Hancock Prospecting is the majority stakeholder in the project with a 70% interest. The remaining 30% stake is held by a consortium comprising POSCO (12.5%), Marubeni (15%), and China Steel Corporation (2.5%). As part of the ownership agreement the various consortium partners have also secured their proportionate share of iron ore production from the Roy Hill Project, representing a combined 16.5 million tonnes per annum of iron ore at full production.

== Mine development ==
Project work commenced in mid-2011 and so far major dredging work of the harbour at South West Creek, within Port Hedland's inner harbour has been completed. Dredging will entail the removal of 7.5 million cubic metres (260 million cubic feet) of material to a depth of 6 metres (20 ft) below the low tide mark, and the construction of two new shipping berths: Stanley 1 and Stanley 2.

Construction of the Ginbata Airport at the mine site and internal mine roads have also been completed, as has clearing of the centre line for the railway. Ginbata Airport is capable of handling Boeing 737 aircraft and will be the hub for transporting the fly-in fly-out workforce.

First shipment of iron ore from the mine commenced in December 2015.

== Transport ==
Railways in the Pilbara region. The Roy Hill Railway is in magenta .

A 344-kilometre (214 mi), 1,435 mm (4 ft 8 1/2 in) heavy haul, standard gauge railway from the minesite to Port Hedland has been built. The rail system can deliver six 240-wagon train loads of 35 thousand tonnes (77 million pounds) of ore each per day.

Capital costs to develop the project were estimated to be at least A$7 billion, and the first shipments from the mine were expected in 2015. The construction of the railway commenced in 2012 and was completed after 27 month, in 2015, with the first ore train travelling the line in December 2015. The new railway included eight bridges over waterways and three over roads and rails. The project jointly won the 2016 Railway Project Award of the Railway Technical Society of Australasia, alongside the Auckland Electrification Project. The combined construction cost of the mine, port and rail was A$10 billion, with a daily cost of A$10 million and a work force of 3,000 reported in 2014.

Roy Hill took delivery of the first of 28 ES44ACIs diesel-electric locomotives in January 2015. Eight other locomotives were delivered between 29 January and 1 February 2015 via the vessel Ocean Charger.

A single span rail bridge carrying the Great Northern Highway over the Roy Hill rail line was completed on 15 February 2019.

As of October 2011 Lumsden Point General Cargo Facility is being built at Port Hedland, and there is also work to repair and upgrade facilities for tugboats.

Roy Hill took delivery of the first of 65 AC44C6Ms diesel-electric locomotives Ex BNSF/GECX C44-9Ws In May 2023.

== Indigenous inhabitants ==
The Indigenous inhabitants of the area are the Nyiyaparli people. The Nyiyaparli language is spoken. The indigenous frequently protest against the exploitation of their land.

== See also ==
- Pilbara Railways
