= Christmas Creek mine =

Iron ore mine in Western Australia

- Location in Western Australia
- Interactive map of Christmas Creek mine
- Location: Shire of East Pilbara, Pilbara, Western Australia, Australia; 22°22′46″S 119°50′59″E
- Products: Iron ore
- Production: 50 million tonnes/annum
- Opened: 2009
- Company: Fortescue Metals Group
- Website: Fortescue website

The Christmas Creek mine is an iron ore mine located in the Pilbara region of Western Australia, 61 km south-south-west of Nullagine, in the Chichester Range.

== Operator ==
The mine is fully owned and operated by the Fortescue Metals Group (FMG) and is one of the two iron ore mines that are part of the Chichester Hub operation; the other is Cloud Break mine, located 50 km west of Christmas Creek.

The other FMG mining hubs in the Pilbara are the Solomon Hub 60 km north of Tom Price and 120 km to the west of the Chichester Hub, and the Western Hub, which includes the Eliwana operation.

Fortescue is the third-largest iron ore mining company in the Pilbara, behind Rio Tinto and BHP.

== History ==
Iron ore mines in the Pilbara region

FMG acquired the Cloudbreak and Christmas Creek tenements during 2003. The company began constructing port facilities at Port Hedland in February 2006, followed by a A$3.2 billion capital raising in August 2006 to finance its projects. Construction on the Cloud Break mine began in October 2006 and Fortescue began mining at Cloud Break in October 2007. Iron ore production at the mine began in 2008 and, in its first full year of operation the mine produced 28 million tonnes of iron ore.

== Processing and transport ==
The ore from the mine is processed on site. Initially, it was loaded onto trucks and transported to Cloudbreak and then on to the coast at Port Hedland through the Fortescue railway, where it is loaded onto ships. Construction on a 280 km long railway from Cloudbreak to the Herb Elliott Port at Point Hedland was begun in November 2006. The line was scheduled to be fully operational within 18 months. A cyclone in March 2007 killed two workers at the project and led to delays. The first train from the mine to the port travelled on 5 April 2008. A 44 km railway linking Christmas Creek to Cloudbreak, allowing ore to be taken all the way to the port by rail, opened in December 2010; further improvements to railways are planned. Electricity to the mine and Cloudbreak is supplied by a local power station, being expanded with a 60 MW solar farm and grid connection to Newman, and performs grid services.

The Pinnacles in Christmas Creek is an Australian Aboriginal sacred site in the area. There is a long history of struggle for land rights in the region.

The mine's workforce is on a fly-in fly-out roster.

Originally, FMG planned to increase the production at Cloudbreak to 55 million tonnes through a US$220 million upgrade of the plant, but this had to be abandoned in October 2009 because of funding difficulties through its Chinese investors. Instead, Fortescue decided to develop the Christmas Creek deposit, at a cost of US$360 million, by building a mine and process plant there and linking it to its existing rail network. Christmas Creek is scheduled to produce 16 million tonnes of iron ore in its first year of operation. Fortescue plans to reach an annual production of 95 million tonnes of iron ore by 2012, downgraded from an earlier target of 120 million.

The Christmas Creek operation began transporting ore by truck to Cloudbreak for processing in June 2009. Construction on the processing facility began in November 2009 and is expected to be completed within 13 month. Commissioning of the new ore processing facility at Christmas Creek is scheduled to begin in February 2011.

On 14 August 2013, an electrician was killed at the Christmas Creek mine when he sustained fatal crush injuries. A second fatality occurred on 29 December 2013 when a contractor was killed in the heavy vehicle workshop at the mine.

== Extension ==
In 2015 the Public Environmental Review for the Christmas Creek Iron Ore Mine expansion was made public, and extensive parts of the review relate to issues of mining adjacent to the Fortescue marshes.
