= Fortescue (company) =

Mining and energy company in Western Australia

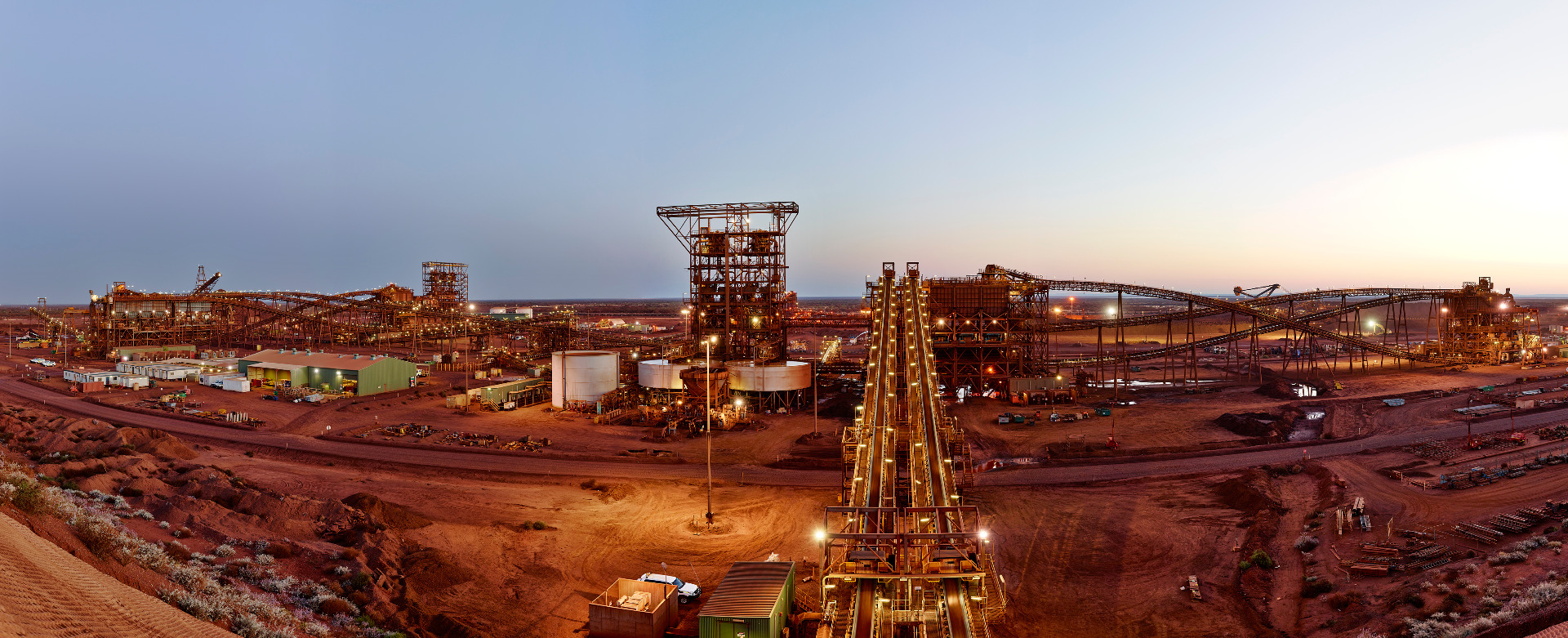
- Ore-processing facility, Christmas Creek Mine, Pilbara, 2018
- Type: Public
- Traded as: ASX: FMG
- ISIN: AU000000FMG4
- Industry: Metals, mining and energy
- Founded: 2003
- Headquarters: Perth, Western Australia
- Area served: Worldwide
- Key people: Dino Otranto (CEO, Metals); Agustín Pichot (CEO, Growth & Energy); Andrew Forrest (executive chairman) (majority shareholder)
- Products: Iron ore, steel, gold, copper, lithium
- Revenue: ▲ A$17.62 billion (2020)
- Operating income: ▲ A$11.50 billion (2020)
- Net income: ▲ A$6.50 billion (2020)
- Total assets: ▲ A$48.05 billion (2020)
- Total equity: ▲ A$26.41 billion (2020)
- Number of employees: 11,000+ (2020)
- Subsidiaries: Fortescue Energy; Fortescue Metals; FMG Resources Pty Ltd; Ncz Investments Pty Ltd; Pilbara Gas Pipeline Pty Ltd; The Nullagine Joint Venture; FMG Resources (August 2006) Pty Ltd; Chichester Metals Pty Limited; FMG Magnetite Pty Ltd; Pilbara Marine Pty Ltd; FMG Pilbara Pty Ltd; Karribi Developments Pty Ltd; FMG Solomon Pty Ltd; FMG Iron Bridge Limited; Fmg Pacific Limited
- Website: fortescue.com

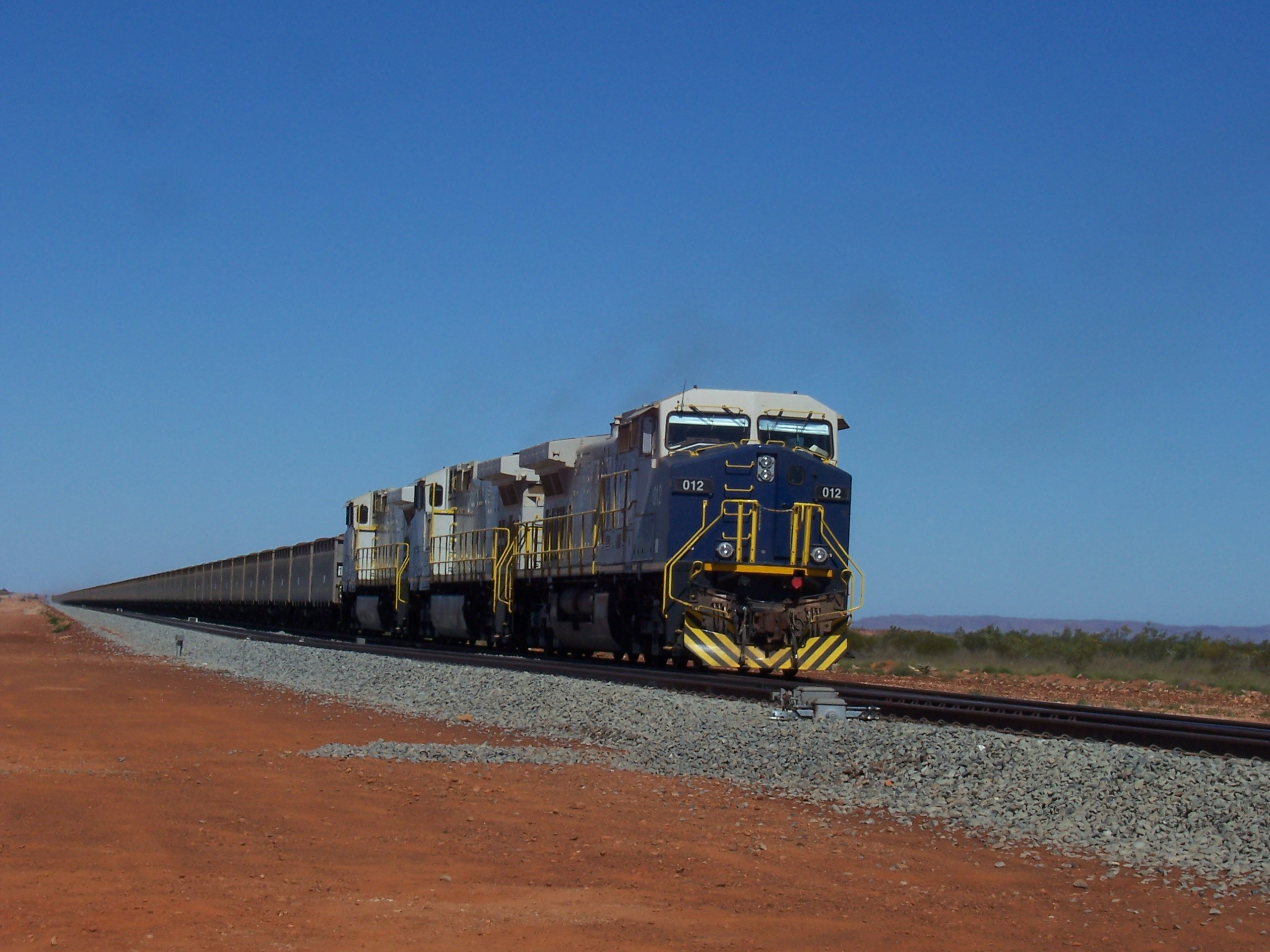
FMG iron ore train, 2008

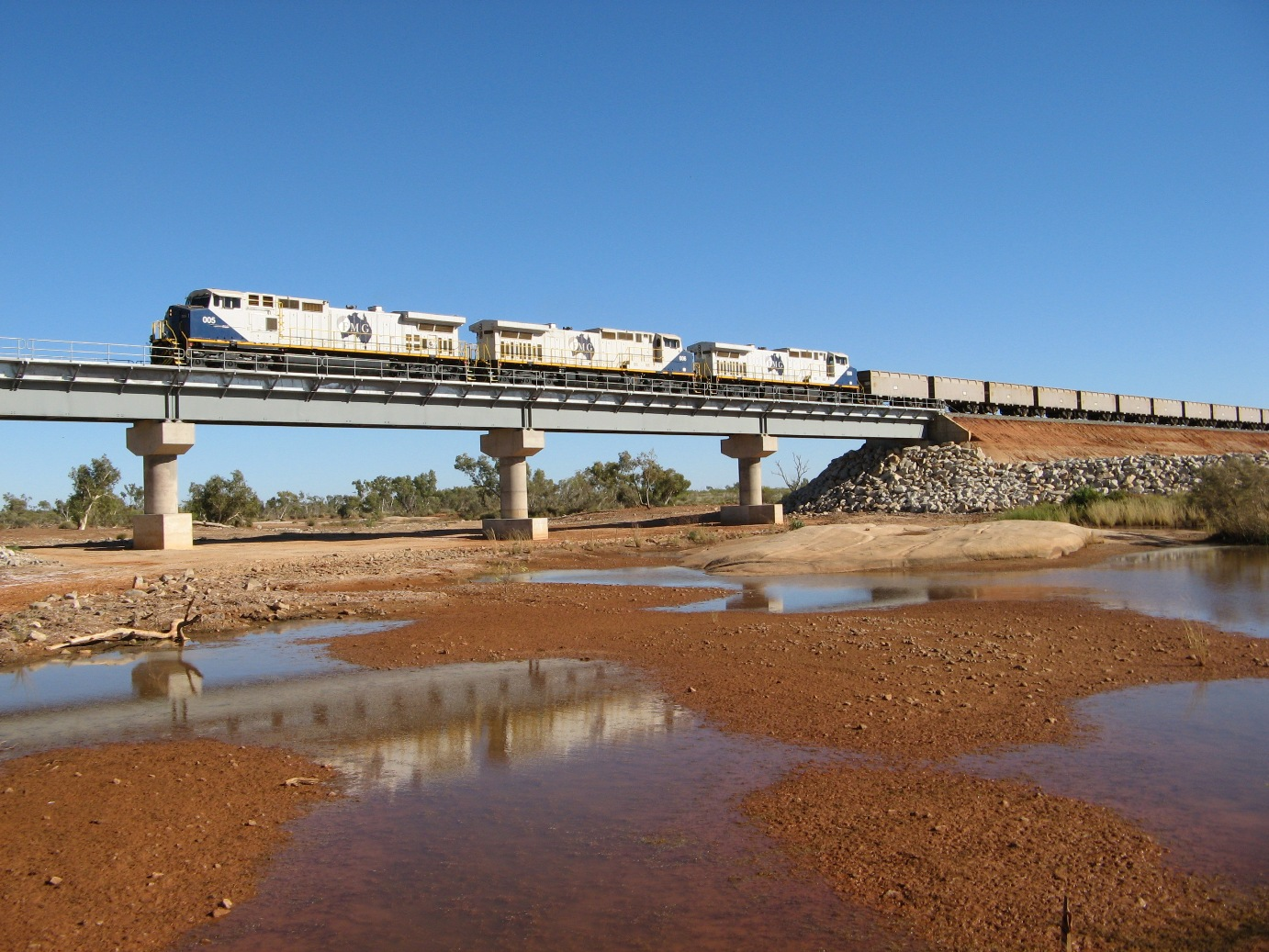
FMG iron ore train on Turner River, 2008

Fortescue is a global metal mining and energy company headquartered in Australia. The company focused on iron ore mining under the name of Fortescue Metals Group (FMG) until July 2023, when it merged with Fortescue Energy. As of 2026, Fortescue was the fourth-largest iron ore producer in the world. The company has holdings of more than 87,000 km^{2} (34,000 square miles) in the Pilbara region of Western Australia, making it the largest tenement holder in the state, larger than both BHP and Rio Tinto.

== Governance ==
As of May 2022, Andrew Forrest was executive chairman and owns a third of the company. Dino Otranto is the CEO of Fortescue's Metals division (since August 2023), and Agustín Pichot is the CEO of the Global Growth & Energy division.

Former chief executive Elizabeth Gaines became global brand ambassador in 2022.

== Mining projects ==
The group has two main areas of operation located within the Pilbara region of Western Australia, the Chichester Hub and Solomon Hub. Plans to develop a third, Western Hub were as of 2017 in developmental stage. In 2017 Fortescue started exploration of possible mining tenements in South America and other parts of Australia.

Fortescue has built 760 kilometres (470 miles) of very heavily engineered railway lines to transport the products of its mines to port.

=== Chichester Hub ===
Located in the heart of the Pilbara, the Chichester Hub is made up of Fortescue's flagship minesite Cloudbreak and the second minesite Christmas Creek. As of 2013, the total Chichester Hub produced 90 million tonnes per annum (mtpa) of iron ore plus an additional five mtpa from a joint venture with BC Iron.

==== Cloudbreak ====
Fortescue's first minesite, Cloudbreak, in 2013 mined 40 million tonnes of iron ore a year. The horizontal nature of the deposits at Cloudbreak called for a new mining approach to those used at other mines, which operate on vertical deposits of ore. Overburden is removed using conventional blast, truck and shovel methods while specially designed surface miners cut and load the ore into trucks for transport to the run of mine stockpiles. Screening, crushing and de-sand plants at the Cloudbreak ore processing facility prepare and refine the product before the ore is stockpiled ahead of transport to port. The train loadout facility at Cloudbreak is capable of feeding 16,000 tonnes of ore per hour on the 2.7-kilometre-long (1.7 mi) trains ready for the journey along the 256-kilometre (159 mi) heavy-haul railway to the facilities at Herb Elliott Port.

==== Christmas Creek ====
Mining began at Christmas Creek, 50 km (31 mi) to the east of Cloudbreak, in 2009. Subsequent expansion projects have lifted production capacity to 50 million tonnes per annum. The operations at Christmas Creek are undergoing expansion and in late 2010 a fifty-kilometre extension to the existing Port Hedland to Cloudbreak rail line was completed to transport the ore to Cloudbreak. The first ore-processing facility (OPF) was commissioned at Christmas Creek in April 2011 with a second OPF commissioned in 2012. As part of the second expansion, a number of additional infrastructure projects were completed, including a 6.3-kilometre (3.9 mi) overland conveyor, a new airstrip, an expansion of the power plant and increasing capacity at the operations village to 1600 rooms.

In 2013, Fortescue awarded Macmahon Holdings a $1.8 billion mining services contract for its Christmas Creek mine expansion. The Christmas Creek expansion increases the capacity of the Chichester operations to 95 million tons a year, and was a key component of the company's 155-million-tonne-a-year expansion plans.

=== Solomon Hub ===
Located in the middle of Fortescue's 87,000-square-kilometre (34,000 sq mi) Pilbara tenement area, the Solomon Hub was Fortescue's next major project. It has almost twice the resource and less than half the strip ratio of the Chichester Hub. Fortescue's Exploration team has already delineated more than 2.86 billion t (2.81 billion long tons; 3.15 billion short tons) of resource at the Solomon Hub and there are identified exploration prospects targeting up to 5 billion t (4.9 billion long tons; 5.5 billion short tons). In May 2013, Fortescue officially opened its 20-million-tonne-per-annum (mtpa) Firetail mine at Solomon. In December 2013, the company announced it had achieved first production from its 40 mtpa Kings Valley mine.

The train load out (TLO) facility at Firetail was commissioned in November 2012 and the first ore was transported on the Fortescue Hamersley Rail Line in December 2012. In December 2012 Fortescue opened the 129-kilometre (80 mi) Solomon Railway that connects Solomon to Fortescue's mainline to its port operations.

A third operation within the Solomon hub, the Queens Valley mine, was approved for construction in 2019 at a projected cost of A$417 million. The mine, located 15 km west of the Kings Valley mine, is scheduled to open in 2022.

On 12 May 2026, Justice Stephen Burley delivered a landmark decision in Yindjibarndi Ngurra Aboriginal Corporation RNTBC v State of Western Australia (No 2) [2026] FCA 585, awarding approximately $150 million for cultural loss and around $100,000 for economic loss for Fortescue's impacts at the Solomon Hub, making it the largest native title compensation award in Australian history. The Court found that significant cultural and spiritual harm had occurred as a result of mining activities, including the destruction or disturbance of numerous heritage sites and impacts on Yindjibarndi connection to Ngurra (Country).

=== Eliwana mine ===
In May 2018 Fortescue announced a US$1.28 billion development of a new mine in the Pilbara at the Eliwana site. This expansion will include an additional 143 km of railway and a dry ore processing plant capable of processing 30 million tonnes a year. The new mine is expected to have an 18-year lifespan and will be funded from the company's cash flow.

The project is expected create 1900 construction jobs and 500 permanent full-time positions with production expected to commence in 2020. The Eliwana mine is part of Fortescue's strategy to move to a 60 per cent iron-grade product.

=== Iron Bridge mine ===
The Iron Bridge mine, located 145 kilometres south of Port Hedland, opened in 2023, sending slurry with 0.028 mm grains by pipeline 135 km to Port Hedland. The mine is projected to produce 22 million tonnes of high-grade 67% magnetite per annum by 2026. The project is a joint venture between Fortescue and Formosa Steel, with Baosteel as a minority share holder.

=== BC Iron ===
BC Iron is a much smaller mining company with iron ore deposits at Nullagine. In 2009, the two companies entered into a 50-50 joint venture in which BC Iron manages mining, crushing and screening, and trucking while Fortescue is contracted to provide haulage and port services to the joint venture. In December 2012 Fortescue sold a 25% stake to BC Iron Ore for A$190 million and agreed to increase the available capacity to the NJV on Fortescue's rail and port infrastructure from the existing 5 million tonnes per annum (mtpa), to 6 mtpa for the life of the joint venture.

=== Atlas Iron ===
In June 2018 Fortescue announced the purchase of 15% of junior iron ore miner Atlas Iron. This brought Fortescue's ownership stakes up to nearly 20%. The acquisition of a controlling interest in Atlas Iron was planned to give Fortescue access to greater port capacity as well as additional higher-grade iron ore tenements. This also potentially allowed a move towards lithium production.

This move was also potentially giving Fortescue access to the North West Infrastructure joint venture. This venture was a collaboration between Atlas Iron, Brockman Mining and FerrAus.

In October 2018, however, Atlas was acquired by Redstone Resources, a fully owned subsidiary of Hancock Prospecting, and delisted from the Australian Securities Exchange on 21 November 2018.

=== Belinga, Gabon ===
In February 2023 Fortescue Metals Group inked in an agreement to develop iron ore at Belinga in north-eastern Gabon with a road and railway to an existing port of Owendo. The initial quantity of ore to be exported is 2 million tonnes of ore per year.

=== Diversifying production ===
Gold, copper and lithium

In 2017 Fortescue announced they were looking to diversify their portfolio by exploring for metals and minerals in South America and other parts of Australia. Gold, copper and lithium were highlighted as commodities of interest.

We continue to undertake early-stage, low-cost exploration on copper gold prospective tenements in South Australia and New South Wales and have assessed high-potential, early-stage exploration tenements in Ecuador, where Fortescue was granted 32 exploration areas.

== Infrastructure ==
Map showing route of the Fortescue railway

The company has built a mine, a private railway and a new port at Point Anderson (also known as Herb Elliot Port) near Port Hedland. The Fortescue rail line has a flyover over the Mount Newman railway, and a crossing of the BHP Billiton railway. The "first ore on ship" on the line occurred in May 2008, three-and-a-half years after construction started.

The railway's 240-wagon iron ore trains are among the heaviest trains in the world. The 1435 mm (4 ft 8 1/2 in) (standard-gauge) heavy-haul railway is used by 35,200-tonne (34,644-long-ton; 38,801-short-ton) trains up to 2.5 km (1.6 mi) long carrying 29,000 t (28,542 long tons; 31,967 short tons) of ore at a 40-tonne (39-long-ton; 44-short-ton) axle load (the weight of the two 4,000-horsepower [3 MW] engines is extra). The railway is available to other miners for a fee. Atlas Exports has signed a commercial agreement to use the line and port.

The railway parallels another iron ore railway, the BHP Billiton railway, for more than 100 km (62 mi). Fortescue had sought access to use this line, but BHP declined.

The FMG railway uses contemporary technology, electronically controlled pneumatic brakes, for all its rolling stock.

== Shipping fleet ==
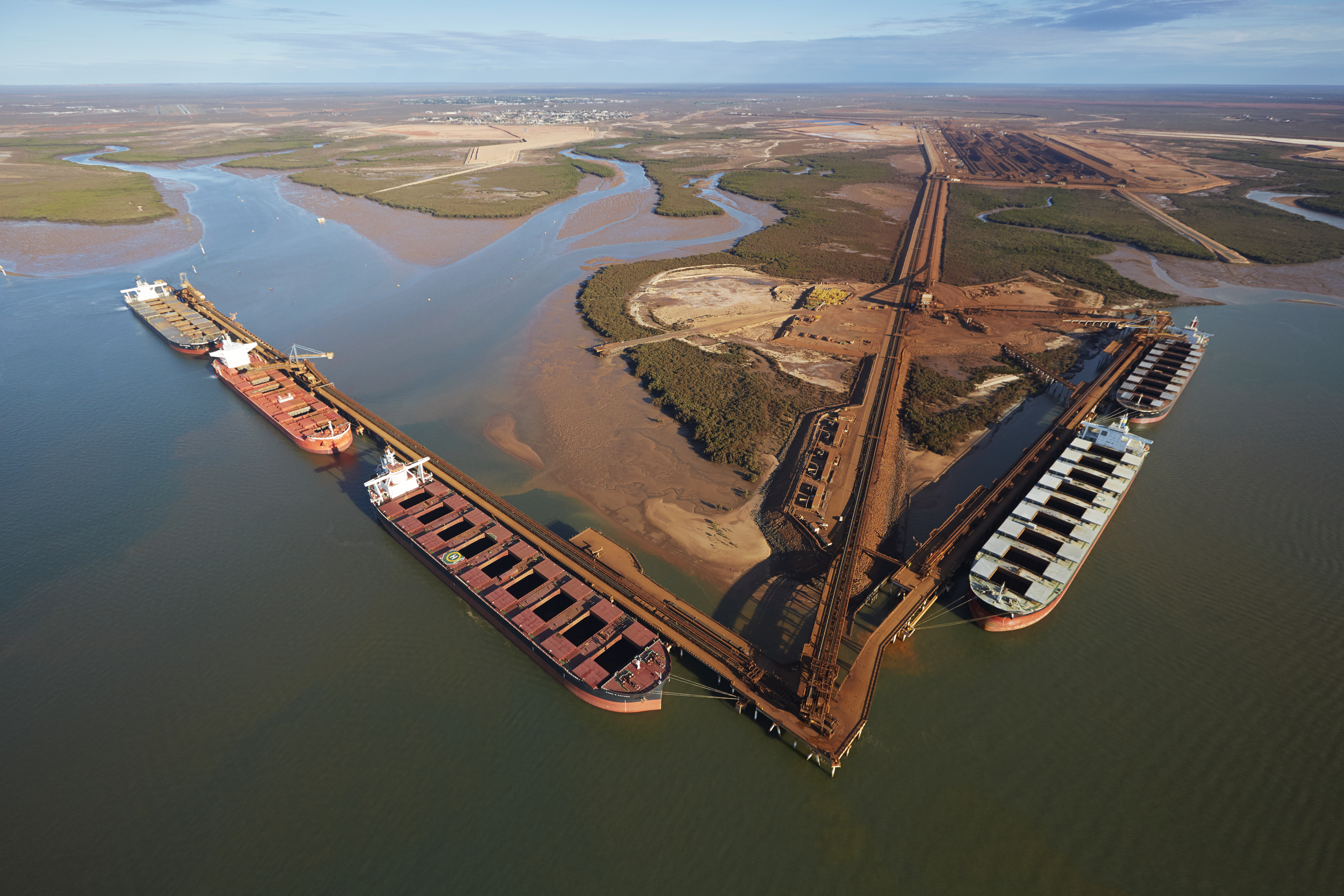
Herb Elliot Port, Port Hedland, 2016

As of June 2018 Fortescue had an operating fleet of seven ore carriers with an eighth currently in construction. Four of the carriers were built by the Yangzijiang shipyard in Jiangsu, China. The rest of the fleet is being built by Guangzhou Shipyard International.

The current operating fleet is:

- FMG Nicola
- FMG Grace
- FMG Sophia
- FMG Sydney
- FMG Matilda
- FMG David
- FMG Amanda – Arrived in Port Hedland in June 2018. Named after Amanda Bennell, a long-term Aboriginal employee with Fortescue.

== Fortescue Energy ==
In 2020, Fortescue Future Industries was created to produce energy in several countries, starting with the 60 MW solar farm at its Chichester Hub.

In October 2021, Fortescue Future Industries and Plug Power Inc. announced a joint venture to build a green hydrogen equipment manufacturing facility in Aldoga, Queensland. The first stage, due for completion in 2022, is expected to double the world's green hydrogen capacity. When the plant is completed, it is expected to be the largest of its type in the world.

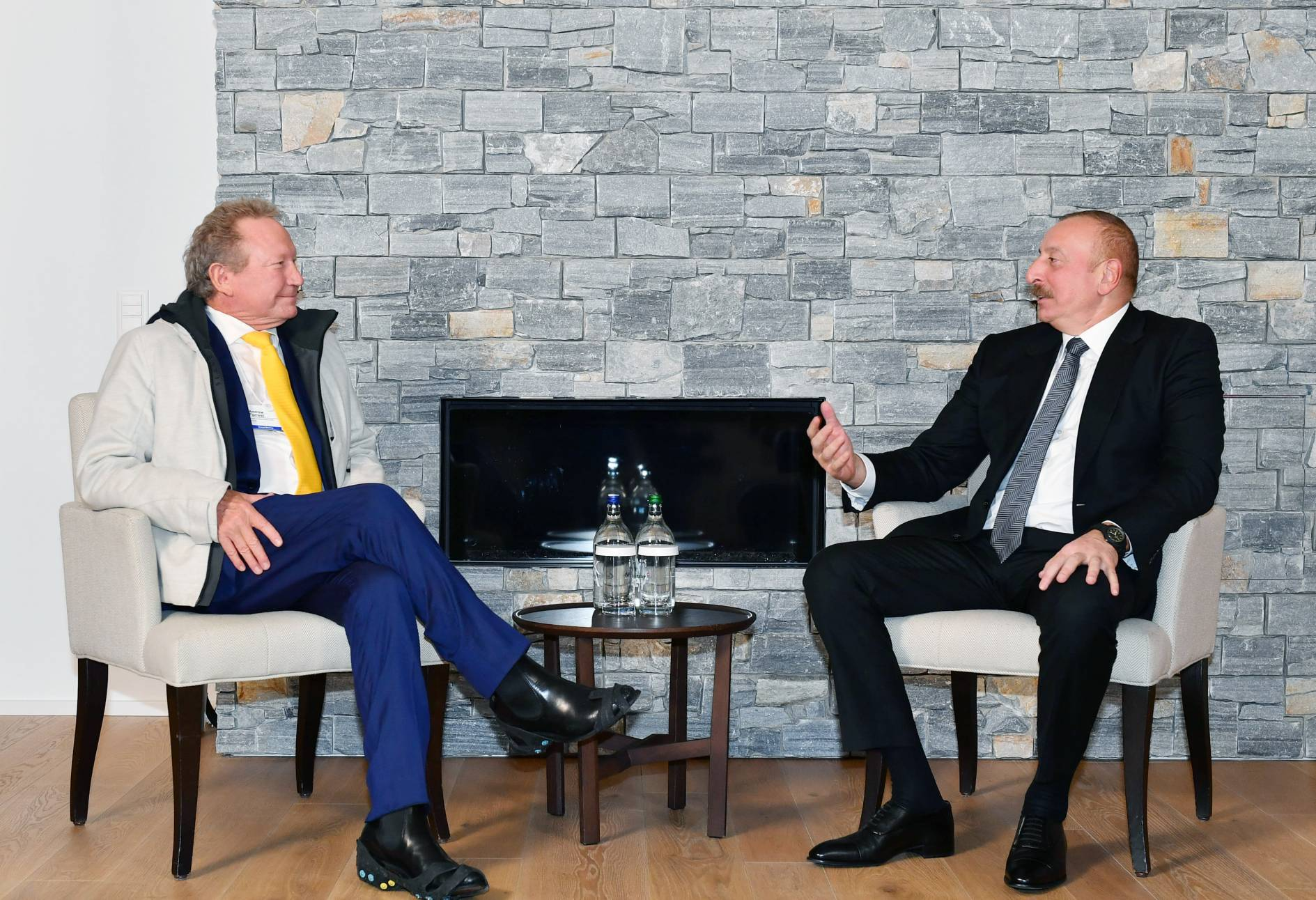
Andrew Forrest, Executive Chairman of "Fortescue Future Industries", with Azerbaijan's President Ilham Aliyev in Davos, 17 January 2023

Also in October 2021, Fortescue Future Industries and Incitec Pivot announced a feasibility study for a new ammonium nitrate production plant in Brisbane. The plant would use PEM electrolysers to generate hydrogen to produce ammonium nitrate, mainly used as fertiliser and as a component in explosives, replacing the conventional manufacturing process which uses natural gas.

In November 2021 it was announced that Fortescue Future Industries would build a plant in Río Negro Province, Argentina, that initially in 2024 would produce 600 MW of green hydrogen a year, rising to 15 GW by 2030.

In July 2023 Fortescue Metals Group and Fortescue Future Industries were combined to form Fortescue.

== Fortescue Zero ==
In March 2022, Fortescue Future Industries acquired UK-based Williams Advanced Engineering (WAE), now rebranded as Fortescue Zero. As part of this acquisition, Fortescue and WAE will jointly develop the world first, zero emission electric Infinity Train that charges itself using the Earth's gravitational force.

=== Fortescue Zero Racing ===
In September 2026, it was announced that Fortescue Zero would be acquiring Penske Autosport with the intent to begin competing in the 2026/27 FIA Formula E World Championship, subject to approval from the FIA. They will be a customer of Jaguar powertrains and will be based in Kidlington, England. They will also be the first team to enter Formula E under an Australian license. The team was formed as Fortescue Zero Racing.

== Controversy ==
=== Misleading and deceptive conduct court case ===
In late 2004 and early 2005, Fortescue chairman and then-CEO Andrew Forrest made a series of announcements that Fortescue had entered into "binding agreements" with three significant Chinese state-owned entities to build and finance infrastructure for the company. The Australian Securities & Investments Commission took legal action against FMG and Forrest. Although an initial ruling by Justice John Gilmour in 2009 found Forrest hadn't acted in a misleading or deceptive manner, Chief Justice Patrick Keane and judges Arthur Emmett and Raymond Finkelstein of the Federal Court of Australia overturned this decision in 2011, finding that FMG and its chairman and CEO, Andrew Forrest, had engaged in misleading or deceptive conduct and breached the continuous disclosure provisions in the Corporations Act, 2001, by claiming to have binding contracts with China.

The court found that a Chinese framework agreement does not amount to a binding contract, in the natural meaning of the word. If found to have breached director's duties, Forrest faced the possibility of being banned as a director of an ASIC-listed company. FMG appealed against the decision, and in October 2012, the High Court found in favour of FMG and Forrest, reversing the decision of the full bench of the Federal Court and agreeing with the original 2009 decision by Justice Gilmour. In his judgement, Justice Honour concluded that Fortescue's releases "correctly represented that there was an agreement, and that it was in the view of the parties binding from the time of board approval".

Despite the early announcement, in 2008, the group loaded its first iron ore shipment bound for China. Fortescue have at least ten Chinese steel mill contracts lasting for around ten years. Baosteel was the first company to receive their iron ore.

== Yindjibarndi legal case ==
Since 2008 Fortescue have been in a legal battle with the traditional owners of the Solomon Mine area, the Yindjibarndi people, where Fortescue (then FMG) acquired mining leases and has been mining since 2013. When Fortescue started planning the Solomon Hub, it entered negotiations with the Yindjibarndi Aboriginal corporation. However, the relationship deteriorated in 2007 when the Yindjibarndi people discovered that FMG had the legal authority to destroy their sacred sites and was doing so during the mine's construction.

After the corporation rejected FMG's royalty offer, the miner supported a breakaway group, the Wirlu-Murra Yindjibarndi Aboriginal Corporation, reportedly to facilitate Fortescue's approvals to mine. This group paid individuals $500 each to attend a meeting in 2010, where the deal was approved. Prior to this, the Yindjibarndi Aboriginal Corporation (YAC) had lodged its opposition to the grant of the three licenses to the Native Title Tribunal in 2009, initially failing to win orders preventing the grant of the licenses. The YAC also failed in its initial Federal Court appeal of that decision last year, and the state government issued the mining licenses to FMG in late November 2010. Both FMG and the YAC are now waiting on the results of a new appeal to the Full Bench of the Federal Court. The company estimated the extraction of 2.4 billion tons of ore over the next 40 years, worth $280 billion, offering less than a deal struck by Rio Tinto that would provide $2 billion over 40 years.

On 8 April 2011, Slater & Gordon, representing the Yindjibarndi Aboriginal Corporation in its negotiations with FMG, requested FMG compensate the Yindjibarndi community. In March 2011, FMG was accused of supporting a break-off group to divide the local Yindjibarndi community during negotiations for access to traditional Yinjibarndi land for the planned $8.5 billion Solomon Hub project. While the law firm admitted FMG has put compensation money up, it said it was insufficient in comparison with the profits that will be made from this mine on the client's traditional land, as well as the royalty (tax) amounts that have been paid to non-Aboriginal people.

In 2021, negotiations over an Indigenous Land Use Agreement failed, and as of May 2022 the Yindjibarndi Aboriginal Corporation is leading a native title compensation claim in the Federal Court, asserting that FMG have been mining on Yindjibarndi land without an agreement. According to the National Native Title Tribunal, the Federal Court needs to make a determination on whether the community is eligible for "compensation for the loss, impairment, diminution or extinguishment of native title rights and interests in the area".

As of 2023, Fortescue had not provided compensation to, or received permission from, the Yindjibarndi people to carry out mining on their land, despite their receiving permission from a larger local Aboriginal corporation, composed of most of the community leaders and elders. Fortescue's operations in the area were said to have destroyed about 250 cultural and sacred sites.

In 2024, the case between Fortescue and Yindjibarndi people continued in the Federal Court. A hearing was held in Roebourne and at a sacred site on Yindjibarndi country, called Bangkangarra, located in the Hamersley Range, in the Pilbara. The Federal Court was informed that a ceremony traditionally used to reconcile the Yindjibarndi people of the Pilbara after disputes had been affected by a division among the traditional owners. During the court hearing on-country, a visibly upset Yindjibarndi elder testified before the Federal Court that Fortescue Metals Group had "stolen" and "destroyed" Yindjibarndi land. Yindjibarndi elder Stanley Warrie wept as he directed Federal Court judge Stephen Burley to observe the red land, now marred by Fortescue’s large metal pipes on the outskirts of its iron ore pit. Warrie told the Federal Court "Fortescue has stolen the land...This is my religion, and it’s been destroyed, my stories, my life. Yindjibarndi land is where my religion is."

During the court case, a senior Yindjibarndi person testified that the land had been so disturbed that it no longer attracted birds, flora, fauna, and sources of traditional food. When asked why, the traditional owner pointed to a mine processing site and stated, "You can see what’s happening here, this infrastructure." He further explained that trucks and cars used at the mine site had disrupted the land.

The court then visited another location – a rock shelter with evidence of occupation dating back 35,000 years – situated beneath an iron ore haulage road. Justice Burnley remarked that he wanted the court to note the "constant and audible sound of vehicles" during the visit.

Fortescue asserted that it does not owe compensation to the Yindjibarndi people, arguing that the responsibility lies with the state of Western Australia, which granted the tenements. The Government of Western Australia disagreed, asserting that the miner is solely responsible.

Both parties then agreed that compensation is owed. This was conveyed to the court during a week-long hearing at the town hall in Roebourne, the same location where negotiations between the Yindjibarndi people and Andrew Forrest broke down in 2011.

Some Yindjibarndi people have stated that the divisions among family and community members resulting from the Fortescue case may be irreparable.

In May 2026, the Federal Court ordered Fortescue to pay $150.1 million in compensation to the Yindjibarndi Ngurra Aboriginal Corporation.

== Aboriginal engagement ==
In August 2013, CEO Nev Power announced the company had achieved its target of awarding $1 billion in contracts to Aboriginal businesses by the end of 2013. Fortescue had made the commitment in 2011 to award $1 billion in contracts to businesses at least 25% owned by Aboriginal Australians through its Billion Opportunities program.

In reaching its target six months early, the company had signed 102 contracts and subcontracts with 50 businesses including $500 million worth of contracts with six Aboriginal joint ventures and Morris Corporation representing the largest-ever package of contracts awarded to Aboriginal businesses. Of the contracts awarded, Fortescue said more than 80% were awarded to Aboriginal businesses that were at least half Indigenous-owned. Fortescue chairman Andrew Forrest told The Guardian: "The depth of what the Indigenous people have achieved and the change in direction they're taking is really historic."

== See also ==
- Pilbara railways
- Williams Grand Prix Engineering
- Fortescue Zero Racing
