= Pilbara Coast =

Coastline of Western Australia

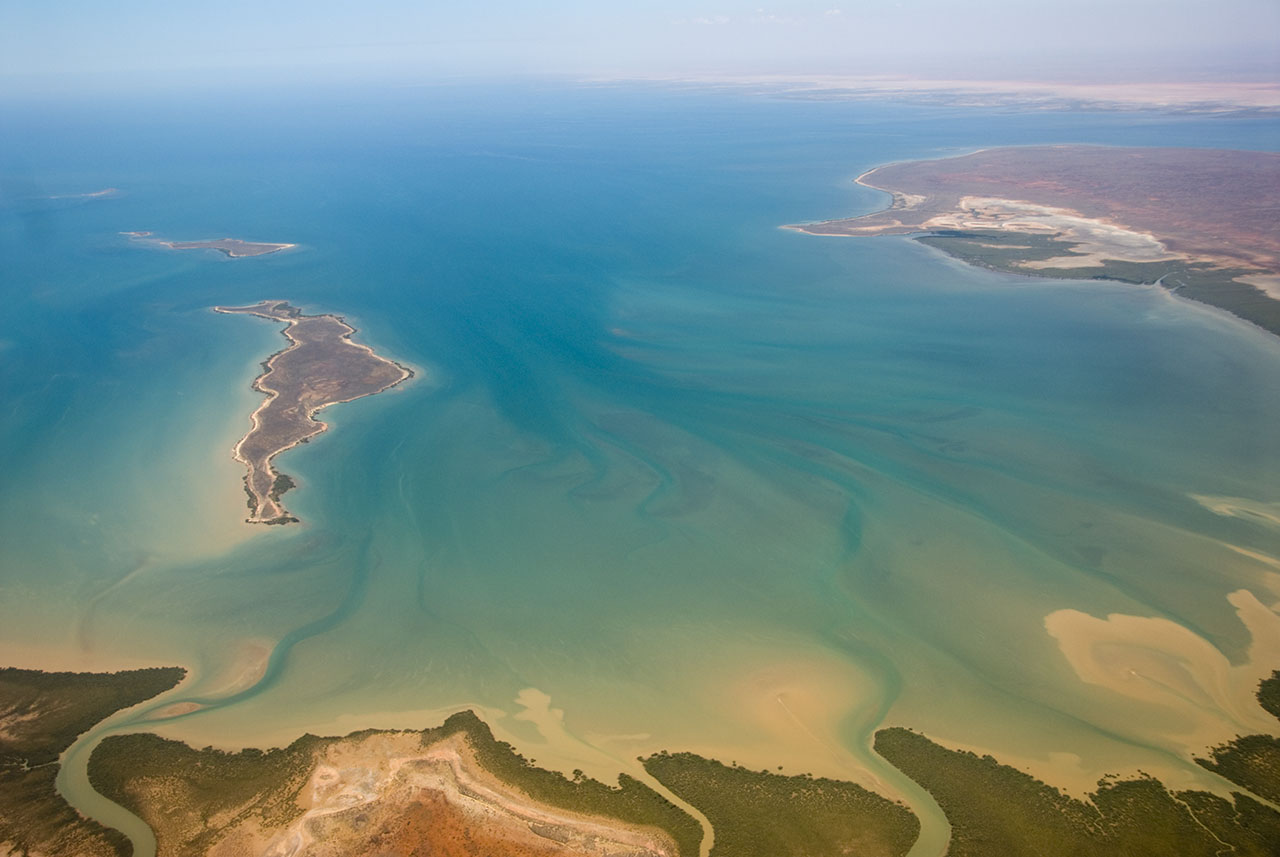
Gales Bay at the southern end of Exmouth Gulf.

The Pilbara Coast is the coastline of Western Australia's Pilbara region. It is often referred to as the North West Coast of Western Australia.

It is a complex array of river mouths, ports, peninsulas, and islands.

== Geography ==
The Pilbara Coast is between North West Cape and Wallal

North West Cape forms the western end of the Pilbara Coast. According to the ICMRA, the Pilbara Coast ends at Cape Keraudren, a rocky headland that forms the western end of Eighty Mile Beach. Others end it further east at Wallal.

Lagoons protected by barrier islands, embayments, river deltas, and rocky headlands are the main coastal features. The Pilbara's intermittent rivers, including the Ashburton, Fortescue, Yule, and De Grey, have deposited sediment to form river deltas. There are many coastal islands, including the near-shore Dampier Archipelago, a cluster of rocky islands and reefs. The larger offshore islands include Barrow Island and the Montebello Islands.

Cenozoic aeolian and beach rock deposits are common along the entire coastline. The western portion of the coast, from North West Cape to Cape Preston including Exmouth Gulf, is underlain by the sedimentary Carnarvon Basin formation. The eastern portion from Cape Preston to Cape Keraudren is near the northern margin of the Pilbara Craton, which is made up of Archaean metamorphic and igneous rocks. The Archean rocks outcrop in several places along the coast, including in the Dampier Archipelago and the adjacent mainland. The offshore islands are mostly composed of limestone, with sandy cays and fringing coral reefs.

== Climate ==
The climate is tropical and semi-arid.

The North West Coast, including the Pilbara Coast and Eighty Mile Beach is the most cyclone-prone region of the entire Australian coastline. On average two cyclones cross the coast each year, one of which is severe.

In Bureau of Meteorology reports, Pilbara Coast West runs from North West Cape to Cape Preston, and Pilbara Coast East is from Cape Preston to Wallal.

== Oceanography ==
The sea floor slopes gently away from the coast, and the 10-metre bathymetric contour is generally between 1 and 2 miles offshore. The waters are turbid near the shore, especially during the spring tides. Tidal range is large with a maximum of 2 to 6 metres. Wave energy is generally low, but cyclonic storms can bring large waves and storm surges.

== Ecology ==
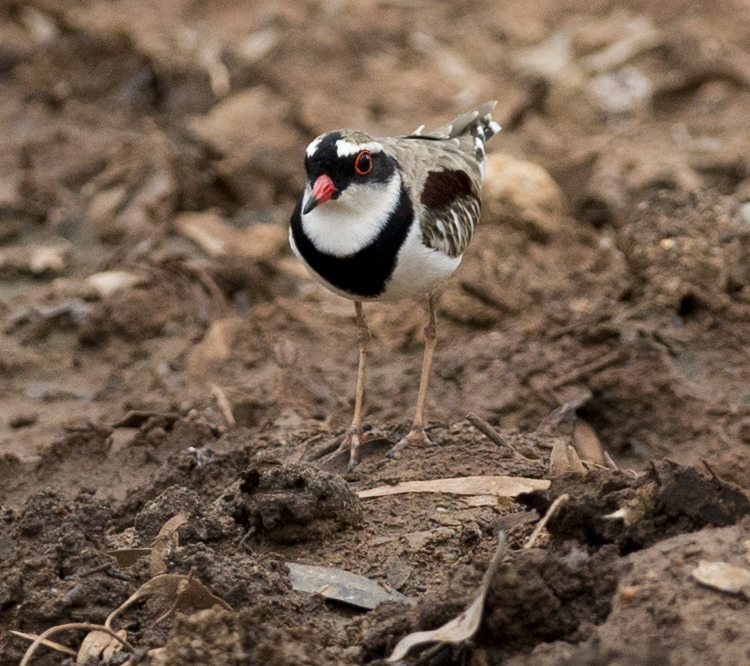
Black-fronted dotterel (Elseyornis melanops) on the Pilbara Coast.

Australia's IMCRA system designates two bioregions on the Pilbara Coast. The Pilbara (nearshore) bioregion extends from the shore to the ten-metre bathymetric contour, and includes the Dampier Archipelago and other near-shore islands. The coastal lagoons and embayments are home to extensive mangrove systems, some of them more than 50 km long. Arid-climate mangroves are globally rare, and the Pilbara Coast has some of the largest areas of arid-climate mangrove on the planet. The Pilbara Coast is home to five species of mangrove – Aegialitis annulata, Aegiceras corniculatum, Avicennia marina, Bruguiera exaristata, Ceriops tagal, and Rhizophora stylosa. Many birds, fishes, and invertebrates live in the mangroves. The intertidal mud flats are home to abundant burrowing invertebrates, which sustain migratory and resident birds.

The Pilbara (offshore) bioregion encompasses the clearer waters beyond the 10-metre depth contour and several offshore islands, including Barrow Island, the Montebello Islands, South and North Muiron, Serrurier, Bessieres, Thevenard, and the Rosily islands. The lower turbidity allows for abundant corals, which form fringing reefs and sustain a diverse coral reef flora and fauna, including many endemic species.

== Aboriginal peoples ==
The Australian Aboriginal peoples of the Pilbara Coast include, from west to east, the Thalanyji, Nhuwala, Martuthunira, Yapurarra, Ngarluma, Kariyarra, Nyamal, and Ngarla.

== Settlements ==
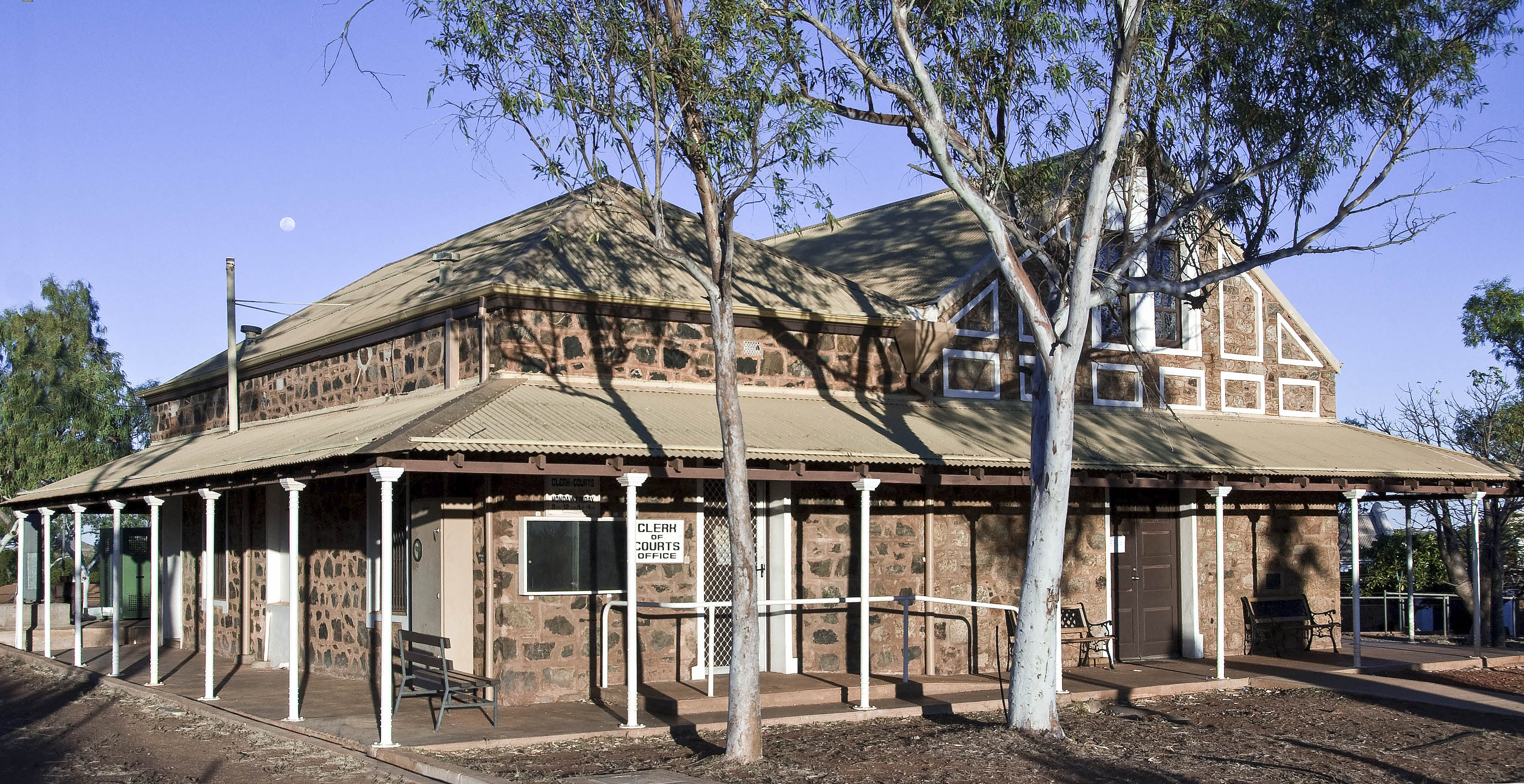
Roebourne Courthouse

Settlements on the coast include the towns of Exmouth, Onslow, Dampier, Karratha, Roebourne, and Port Hedland. Dampier is an industrial port which exports iron ore from the interior and liquified natural gas from the offshore Greater Gorgon gas field. Port Hedland's industrial port also exports iron ore.

== Protected areas ==
- Eighty Mile Beach Marine Park and Marine Protected Area protect the eastern portion of the coast.
- Dampier Marine Park
- Montebello Marine Park
- Great Sandy Island Marine Protected Area

== See also ==
- Batavia Coast
- Kimberley Coast
