= Ngarluma language =

Endangered Ngayarda language of Western Australia

Ngarluma
- Kariyarra
- Native to: Western Australia
- Region: Roebourne area
- Ethnicity: Ngarluma, Kariera, Jaburara
- Native speakers: 11 (2005)
- Language family: Pama–Nyungan: Ngayarda; Ngarluma

Language codes
- ISO 639-3: Either: nrl – Ngarluma vka – Kariyarra
- Glottolog: ngar1293
- AIATSIS: W38 Ngarluma, W39 Kariyarra
- ELP: Ngarluma
- Kariyarra

Ngarluma and Kariyarra are members of a dialect continuum, which is a part of the Ngayarda language group of Western Australia, in the Pama–Nyungan language family. Some sources suggest that an extinct dialect, Jaburara, was a third member of the continuum. However, it is clear that Jaburara had a distinct identity that has been partly obscured by a collapse in the numbers of Jaburara speakers during the late 19th century, and there is some evidence that Jaburara may have instead been a dialect of Martuthunira (see below).

While Ngarluma and Kariyarra, as parts of a continuum, are mutually intelligible, they are considered distinct languages by their speakers, reflecting an ethnic division between the Ngarluma and Kariyarra peoples. As such they may be regarded as a single, pluricentric language.

Under Carl Georg von Brandenstein's 1967 classification scheme, Ngarluma was classed as a "Coastal Ngayarda" (or Ngaryarta) language, but the separation of the group into "Coastal" and "Inland" groups is no longer considered valid.

== Dialects ==
Pidgin Ngarluma
- Native speakers: None
- Language family: Ngarluma-based pidgin

Language codes
- ISO 639-3: None (mis)
- Glottolog: pidg1247
- ELP: Ngarluma

Apart from the division between Ngarluma and Kariyarra, there are either three or four sub-dialects within Ngarluma. However, the inclusion of Jaburara – which parallels a belief amongst Ngarluma people that the Jaburara people and their traditional land were a sub-group of the Ngarluma people and lands – is controversial. There are two reasons for this: the Jaburara dialect is sometimes considered a dialect in its own right, or a dialect of Martuthunira. There is evidence for the latter theory in the word jaburara, which means "northerners" in the languages of the region: the traditional lands of the Jaburara, on and around the Burrup Peninsula, are generally to the north of the Martuthunira lands (whereas the Jaburara are mostly west of the Ngarluma lands).

A pidginized form of Ngarluma was once used as a contact language in the area.

== Phonology ==
=== Vowels ===
	Front	Back
High	i	u
Low	a	

=== Consonants ===
	Peripheral		Laminal		Apical	
	Labial	Velar	Dental	Palatal	Alveolar	Retroflex
Plosive	b	k/ɡ	t̪	ɟ	d	ɖ
Nasal	m	ŋ	n̪	ɲ	n	ɳ
Lateral			l̪	ʎ	l	ɭ
Rhotic					r	
Approximant	w			j		ɻ

- The trill /r/ can also be heard as a tap [ɾ].
- Prenasal consonants also occur phonetically as [n̪t̪] [ɳɖ].

== Linguistic area/boundaries ==
Kariyarra people, prior to European settlement occupied an area from the Yule River east to Port Hedland and south to the Hamersley Range.

The official Ngarluma Native Title Determination Area (including the Jaburara lands) covers the area southward from Point Samson, Cossack, Wickham, Roebourne, to the northern boundary of Millstream-Chichester National Park and; from the east side of the mouth of the Maitland River to the west side of the Peawah River near Whim Creek, including the towns of Dampier and Karratha.

However, this boundary is controversial for two reasons: it includes areas also regarded as traditional country by many Martuthunira people and; for legal reasons, it does not include areas that many Ngarluma people consider to fall into their traditional country.
