= Kariera people =

Aboriginal people of Western Australia

The Kariera or Karieri people were an Aboriginal Australian people of the Pilbara, who once lived around the coastal and inland area around and east of Port Hedland.

== Country ==
According to Norman Tindale the Kariera held sway over some 4,500 square miles (12,000 km^{2}) of tribal land and were centred around the Peeawah, Yule, and Turner Rivers, as far as Port Hedland. Their western boundary ran to the scarp of the Hamersley tableland at the Yule River's headwaters. Their land took in the Mungaroon Range, the area north of Wodgina, at Yandeyarra. Their eastern frontier ran along a line connecting McPhee Hill, Tabba Tabba Homestead, and the mouth of Petermarer Creek.

Their neighbours were the Nyamal Pundju to the east and, running clockwise, the Yindjibarndi, and the Ngarluma on their western flank.

== History ==
With the arrival of white settlers, disease decimated most of the Kariera. By the late first decade of the 1900s, the Kariera tribal system had almost disintegrated, the oldest informant in one case being the last member of his clan. A hundred at that time lived on and around the sheep stations that had been established on their land.

== Ecology ==
The Kariera lands ran along the coast from a point east of the Sherlock River to Port Hedland and inland, for about 50 miles over the De Grey area and the Yule and Turner Rivers. In terms of tribal topography, the Ngarla lay east, the Ngarluma to their west, while the Yindjibarndi and Nyamal dwelt respectively up to their southern and south-eastern frontiers, encompassing an area of around 3,400–4,000 square miles (8,800–10,400 km^{2}).

Much of the traditional Kariera landscape, marked by Aboriginal rock art, of which several examples have been discovered from Port Hedland into the interior, was inscribed in the Minyiburu songline, which was only recorded as late as 1977 by Kingsley Palmer.

== Kinship and social organization ==
Radcliffe-Brown's analysis of their kinship structure was drawn, perhaps with the assistance of earlier notes made by Daisy Bates, and it was intended as challenging some key premises of Émile Durkheim's classic study The Elementary Forms of the Religious Life (1912); it provided a sophisticated model of "interlocking complex of beautiful and symmetrical kinship systems", though it was pieced together from stray informants from the broken Kariera tribal world. Ironically, it has been observed, as the tribe disappeared, what remnants of their lore survived to be recorded began to make an important impact on anthropological thinking, with elements of it anticipated by some decades the core approach of structural functionalism decades later. A. P. Elkin described the Kariera structure as one of five kinship types in north Western Australia, and a type also found among the Wailpi people of the Flinders Ranges in South Australia. The re-analysis of this Kariera theory played a significant role in Claude Lévi-Strauss's The Elementary Structures of Kinship (1949).

The Kariera consisted of at least 19 residence-based groups, each with its own defined territory. Their kinship structure consisted of a four-class system, which can be represented as follows:

Banaka (Pannaga) savage goanna (dry) active & abstract	Burung (Purunu) lazy goanna (moist) passive & abstract
Karimera (Karimarra) plains kangaroo (fierce) active & concrete	Palyeri (Palt'arri) hill kangaroo (mild) passive & concrete

A Banaka male marries a Burung female: their offspring are classified as Palyeri. Palyeri men marry Karimera women, and their children become Banaka. The children of a Karimera man married to a Palyeri woman become Burung. Thus two patrilineal moieties form: Banaka/Palyeri and Karimera/Burung. Radcliffe-Brown found no explanation for these section names, and thought them meaningless. Decades of intensive analysis failed to come up with an explanation of this four-section social system. In 1970 however the linguist Carl Georg von Brandenstein managed to connect the four section names with animals: pannaga and purungu (burung) were linked to the goanna, while karimera (karimarra) and palyeri (palt'arri) were associated with the kangaroo. In addition, in a way reminiscent of Western humoral theory, the elements in the classification suggested, as one can see in the diagram combinations of three oppositions – active/passive, warm-blooded/cold-blooded, and concrete/abstract – that each section embodied one of each of this binary elements in the code. It would follow that a sophisticated metaphysics was inscribed within the social order itself. The broader implication was that the attempt to isolate a theory of kinship itself, in terms of descent and marriage alone, were flawed, since many other distinct criteria, such as locality and totem, were also embedded in one's institutional identity.

== Impact ==
Apart from the germinal influence of Radcliffe-Brown's study of Kariera kinship for anthropological theory, his classification of their territorial divisions, it is argued, laid the groundwork for later Aboriginal claims to native title.

== Alternative names ==
- Gariera
- Kaierra
- Kariera, Karriara, Karriarra
- Kyreara
- Minjiburu, Minjubururu, Minjirbururu (Kariara term for an ancient Port Hedland)
- Kudjunguru ("coastal dwellers", Nyamal exonym for the Kariera and Ngarla)
- Paljarri

== Sources ==
- "AIATSIS map of Indigenous Australia". AIATSIS. 14 May 2024.
- Barnard, Alan [in German] (2012). Genesis of Symbolic Thought. Cambridge University Press. ISBN 978-1-139-51100-1.
- Descola, Philippe (2013). Beyond Nature and Culture. University of Chicago Press. ISBN 978-0-226-14500-6.
- Elkin, A. P. (1954) [First published 1938]. The Australian Aborigines (3rd ed.). Doubleday Anchor.
- Frazer, James George (1994) [First published 1914]. Totemism and Exogamy. Collected Works of James G. Frazer. Vol. 7. RoutledgeCurzon. ISBN 978-0-700-71338-7.
- Harper, Charles (1886). "Mouth of the De Grey River". In Curr, Edward Micklethwaite (ed.). The Australian race: its origin, languages, customs, place of landing in Australia and the routes by which it spread itself over the continent (PDF). Vol. 1. Melbourne: J. Ferres. pp. 287–293.
- Jenkins, A. (1979). The Social Theory of Claude Lévi-Strauss. Springer. ISBN 978-1-349-03683-7.
- Kloss, Heinz; McConnell, Grant D., eds. (1981). Linguistic Composition of the Nations of the World: Oceania. Vol. 4. Presses Université Laval. ISBN 978-2-763-76967-7.
- Langham, Ian (1981). The Building of British Social Anthropology: W.H.R. Rivers and his Cambridge disciples in the development of kindship studies, 1898-1931. Springer. ISBN 978-9-027-71264-6.
- Layton, Robert (1992). Australian Rock Art: A New Synthesis. Cambridge University Press. ISBN 978-0-521-34666-5.
- Lévi-Strauss, Claude (1969). The Elementary Structures of Kinship. Beacon Press.
- McDonald, Jo; Veth, Peter (December 2013). "Rock Art in Arid Landscapes: Pilbara and Western Desert petroglyphs" (PDF). Australian Archaeology. 77 (77): 66–81. doi:10.1080/03122417.2013.11681980. S2CID 146209616.
- Needham, Rodney (2013). Remarks and Inventions: Skeptical Essays about Kinship. Routledge. ISBN 978-1-136-53612-0.
- Palmer, Kingsley (April 1977). "Myth, Ritual and Rock Art Archaeology & Physical Anthropology in Oceania". Archaeology & Physical Anthropology in Oceania. 12 (1): 38–50. JSTOR 40386276.
- Radcliffe-Brown, Alfred (1913). "Three Tribes of Western Australia". Journal of the Royal Anthropological Institute. 43: 143–194.
- Radcliffe-Brown, Alfred (July 1930). "The Social Organization of Australian Tribes. Part II". Oceania. 1 (2): 206–246. doi:10.1002/j.1834-4461.1930.tb01645.x. JSTOR 40327321.
- Ray, Arthur J. (2016). Aboriginal Rights Claims and the Making and Remaking of History. McGill-Queen's University Press. ISBN 978-1-139-51100-1.
- Sutton, Peter (2004). Native Title in Australia: An Ethnographic Perspective. Cambridge University Press. ISBN 978-1-139-44949-6.
- "Tindale Tribal Boundaries" (PDF). Department of Aboriginal Affairs, Western Australia. September 2016. Archived from the original (PDF) on 8 March 2016.
- Tindale, Norman Barnett (1974). "Kariara (WA)". Aboriginal Tribes of Australia: Their Terrain, Environmental Controls, Distribution, Limits, and Proper Names. Australian National University. ISBN 978-0-708-10741-6. Archived from the original on 20 March 2020.
