= North West Shelf Project =

Oil and gas project in the north west of Western Australia

North West Shelf Venture leases and infrastructure

The North West Shelf Project (NWS), also known as the North West Shelf Venture, is an Australian resource development project, extracting natural gas from under the ocean from the North West Shelf off the coast of Western Australia. Running since the 1980s, it is Australia's largest such project. It involves the extraction of petroleum (mostly natural gas and condensate) at offshore production platforms, onshore processing at the Karratha Gas Plant, and production of natural gas for industrial, commercial, and domestic use within the state, as well as the export of liquefied natural gas. The Karratha Gas Plant, which is located on the Murujuga Cultural Landscape (Burrup Peninsula), is operated by Woodside Energy. At least 5,000 sacred rock art sites were destroyed for the construction of the North West Shelf. The project has faced opposition from Ngarda-ngarli, Traditional Owners, of Murujuga since inception. The plant supplies up to 15 per cent of Western Australia's gas needs, with the rest exported overseas; none flows to the eastern states.

It was owned by a joint venture of six partners – BHP, BP, Chevron, Shell, Woodside Petroleum and a 50:50 joint venture between Mitsubishi and Mitsui & Co – with each holding an equal one-sixth shareholding. Along with being a joint venture partner, Woodside is the project operator on behalf of the other participants. In June 2022, BHP Petroleum merged with Woodside Energy, giving Woodside Energy a one-third shareholding in the project.

In 2020–2021, the North West Shelf Project was the single largest industrial emitter for Australia, according to the Clean Energy Regulator. The project was planned to be shut down in 2030, but, after the federal government spent six years assessing the matter, on 12 September 2025 Environment Minister Murray Watt gave final approval for the extension of the project until 2070, raising environmental and cultural concerns.

== Overview ==
The North West Shelf Project (NWS) involves the extraction of petroleum from the Carnarvon Basin off the north-west coast of Australia, mostly in the form of natural gas and condensate using offshore production platforms, as well as onshore processing. It produces natural gas for industrial, commercial, and domestic use within the state, as well as exporting liquefied natural gas. Woodside Energy Ltd is the operator for the North West Shelf Joint Venture (NWSJV), which proposed to continue and extend the operating life of the NWS Project, originally planned to have a 30-year lifespan. NWS is one of the largest LNG projects in the world, and a major employer in the region, underpinned by huge hydrocarbon reserves within the Carnarvon Basin.

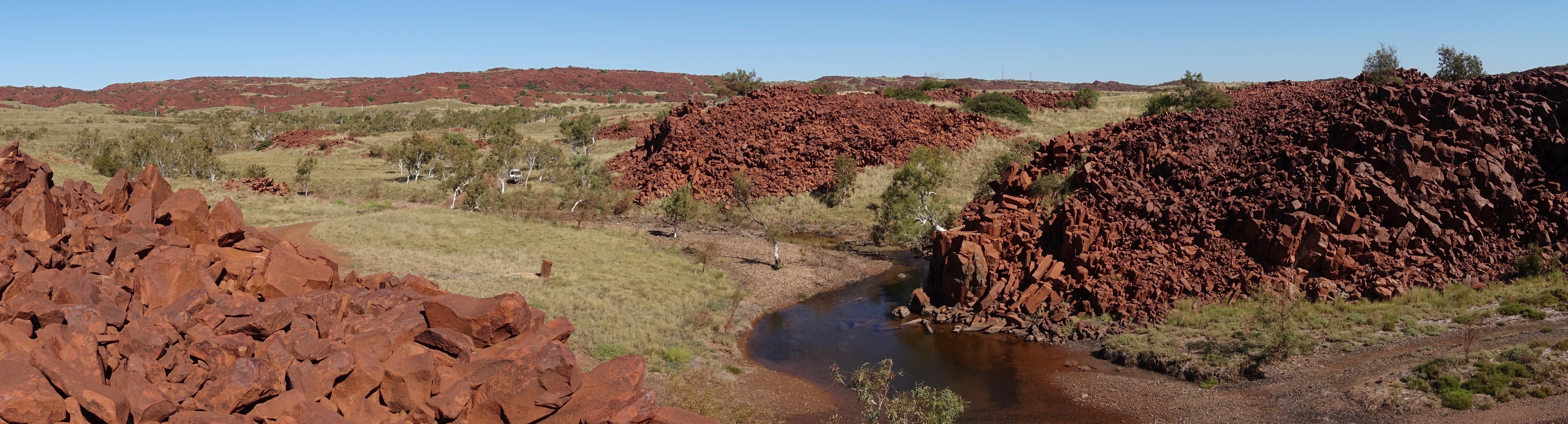
Murujuga

North West Shelf gas is processed at the Karratha Gas Plant on the Burrup Peninsula (Murujuga), which is operated by Woodside. Over 5,000 sacred rock art sites were destroyed to build the gas plant when it was built in the 1980s (commissioned in 1984).

== History ==
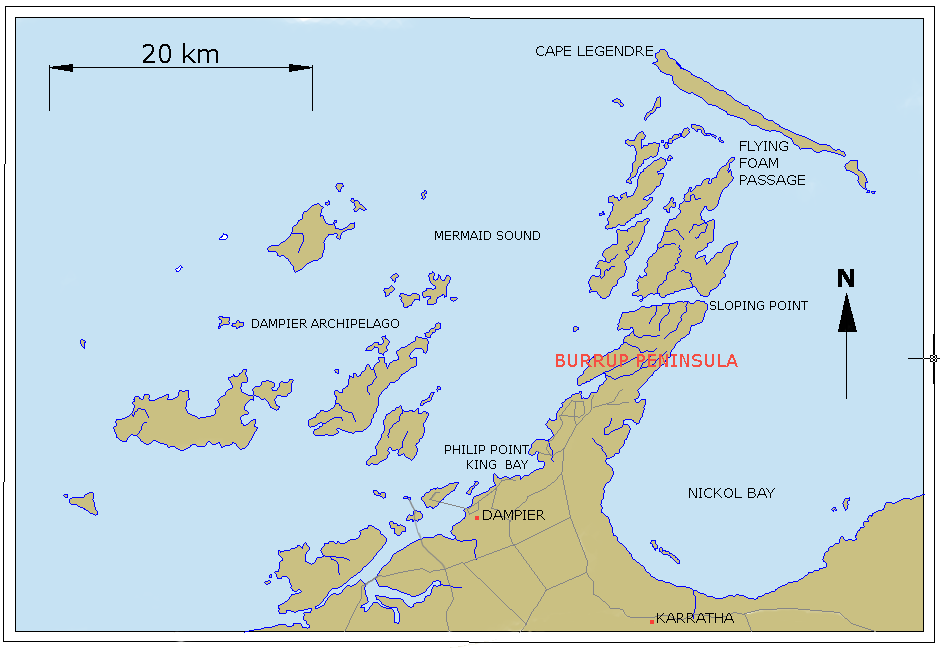
Map showing Burrup Peninsula and Dampier Archipelago

The land and sea where the North West Shelf now operate has been occupied for tens of thousands of years by Yaburara people. Evidence shows that even the seabed where North West Shelf trunklines were built, was occupied, given it was exposed during periods of lower ocean levels at multiple times throughout history. Ancient stone artefacts have been located on the seabed in the vicinity of North West Shelf Trunklines and Karratha Gas Plant. This shows that not only was the modern day Murujuga land occupied, but so too was much of the now-submerged seabed. The Yaburara, who are often considered a sub-group of the Ngarluma people or a language group in their own right, created the petroglyphs across the Murujuga cultural landscape, including a heavy concentration of rock art where the North West Shelf project is now located. Estimates put the age of the rock art where the North West Shelf was built, which would later be destroyed to build the onshore processing gas processing plant, at 50,000 years old.

Discoveries of large gas reserves at the North Rankin, Goodwyn, and Angel gas fields within the Carnarvon Basin were made in the early 1970s. Extraction was technically challenging, and in order to make it commercially viable, unprecedented levels of investment were poured into the project, which began in the early 1980s. In the late 1980s, it was the largest engineering project in the world. With investments totaling A$25 billion since the early 1980s as of 2008, the project was the largest resource development in Australian history, and remains so in 2025.

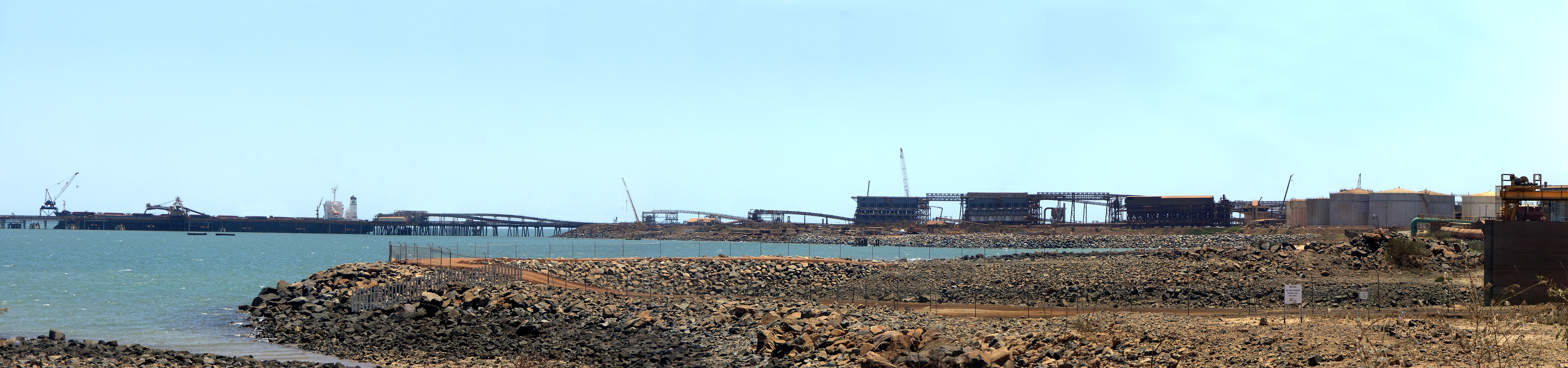
Dampier Port

The first phase of NWS included the development of the North Rankin A offshore drilling and production platform, a submarine pipeline to shore at Mermaid Sound in the Port of Dampier, and facilities for delivery of domestic gas via a pipeline to Perth and Bunbury, and provision for exporting excess condensate. The second phase involved building two LNG processing trains, along with storage tanks, export facilities, and tankers for transporting the LNG. The construction of the Karratha Gas Plant, the location of the LNG processing trains, mean approximately 5,000 sacred rock art sites were destroyed by dynamite and bulldozers. The Traditional Owners were locked out, unable to protect cultural sites. This was later described by Traditional Owners as “harm that cannot be described in words. This trauma is still here. Our people never consented to this destruction. Not only did we not consent, but we were blocked from even coming near the area while dynamite blasted our sacred sites and bulldozers systematically destroyed our Ngurra (Country)”. Archaeologist Ken Mulvaney later wrote about the construction of the North West Shelf's Karratha Gas Plant, and the instruction from the state and proponents not to allow Aboriginal people near the sites. Mulvaney lamented that archaeologists tried to record rock art as bulldozers were crushing the sacred sites. He would write that “Much of the early industrial development of the Dampier Archipelago occurred prior to any heritage legislation, which was enacted for Western Australia in 1972. However, the North West Shelf Venture development of the Karratha Gas Plant at Withnell Bay occurred at a time when the heritage values of the archipelago where better understood. Salvage and recording in front of the bulldozer should never be the last resort of the concerned. As a nation we must value our entire cultural heritage[…] The development push for the Dampier Archipelago continues apace, even when this results in the destruction of our cultural past”.

Despite construction in 1980s, and first production that decade, Woodside and the North West Shelf Joint Venture partners did not seek to enter a land agreement with Traditional Owners until after the Native Title Act was passed. Pressure mounted for the North West Shelf to enter a Land agreement, and an agreement was executed in 1998, though many Elders were unable to read or write and signed with an ‘X’. The Agreement does not provide royalties for Traditional Owners, and no royalties have been paid by the North West Shelf to Traditional Owners throughout its life. The Ngarluma Yindjibarndi Foundation Ltd (NYFL) is the party representing Traditional Owners for the 1998 Agreement, though NYFL has never received royalties.

In 2012 first two phases of the project received an Engineering Heritage International Marker from Engineers Australia as part of its Engineering Heritage Recognition Program.

NWS was owned by a joint venture of six partners – BHP, BP, Chevron, Shell, Woodside Petroleum and a 50:50 joint venture between Mitsubishi and Mitsui & Co – with each holding an equal one-sixth shareholding. Along with being a joint venture partner, Woodside is the project operator on behalf of the other participants. On 1 June 2022, BHP's Petroleum business merged with Woodside Energy, giving Woodside Energy a one-third shareholding in the project.

In 2019, Woodside and the other joint venture partners proposed to extend the life of the project, including the Karratha Gas Plant. On 28 May 2025, after spending six years on assessing the matter, the federal Environmental Minister Murray Watt approved the Karratha Gas Plant operation until 2070, drawing criticism from Traditional Owners and environmentalists. Existing gas fields are being depleted, and to continue the operation of the Karratha Gas Plant, gas reserves in the Browse Basin would need to be exploited. The Browse Basin is around 400 km (250 mi) off the north-west coast of WA, for which Woodside commenced seeking approval for in 2018. A previous project, Browse LNG, had been shelved as an onshore project at James Price Point in 2013, citing lack of economic viability. There had also been controversy over its siting by both environmentalists and Traditional Owners. James Price Point is close to the world's largest dinosaur footprints as well as several Aboriginal sacred sites. An alternative floating platform was being considered. Prime Minister Anthony Albanese said that the extended supply of gas was necessary to increase Western Australia's renewables, to provide "firming capacity" to encourage investment in renewables.

There are other technical issues with the gas in the Browse Basin, as the gas has a high percentage of carbon dioxide. In order to remain in line with emissions commitments, it requires a complex carbon capture and storage program, which may not prove economically feasible. Woodside's justification for the expansion of NWS is that if Australia does not produce more gas, it would need more coal. However, lead analyst for Australian gas at the Institute for Energy Economics and Financial Analysis, Josh Runciman, questioned this logic.

On 28 May 2025 Environment Minister Murray Watt provisionally approved the extension of the project until 2070. The conditions were not made public, pending a response from Woodside Energy, raising environmental and cultural concerns. On 12 September 2025 he gave final approval for the project, subject to 48 conditions, including reducing certain gas emissions by 2030, and reaching net-zero emissions by 2050. These conditions, along with additional new legal protections, are intended to protect the rock art. Peter Hicks, chair of the Murujuga Aboriginal Corporation, approved of the conditions and thanked the government for providing certainty. However, former chair Raelene Cooper intends to take legal action against the government on behalf of her people, saying that Watt May have breached his statutory duties and international legal obligations.

== Assets ==
=== Offshore facilities ===
==== North Rankin Complex ====
Commissioned in 1984, North Rankin A (NRA)was the then-largest gas production platform in the world, capable of producing 1,815 million cubic feet (51,400,000 m³) of gas per day and up to 47,400 barrels per day (7,540 m^{3}/d) of condensate. Modifications increased the facility's capacity by 50% and as of 2004 it remained one of the world's largest gas platforms. It is located 135 km (84 mi) north-west of Dampier, and services 25 production wells in the North Rankin and Perseus fields.

In March 2008, the partners approved a A$5 billion North Rankin 2 project, which included the installation of North Rankin B (NRB). NRB was ultimately commissioned in 2013, standing in 125 m (410 ft) of water, and is linked to North Rankin A by two bridges. NRB's primary function is to provide gas compression and condensate pumping of fluids produced from the NRA wells and exported via the NRA export facilities.

Together, North Rankin A and North Rankin B, along with two export trunklines (TL1 and TL2) which run between them and the KGP, make up the North Rankin Complex (NRC).

==== Goodwyn A (GWA) ====
At a cost of A$2bn, the platform was, when commissioned in early 1995, the largest single offshore oil and gas investment ever made in Australia. In late 2001, the Goodwyn platform was linked to the Echo/Yodel gas and condensate fields via a 23 km 12-inch (300 mm) pipeline. Hydrocarbons from the Goodwyn field are transferred via a subsea pipeline to North Rankin before being transported to Karratha for processing. It is designed for up to 30 production wells, including five re-injection wells. It accommodates 137 people. It has a production capacity of 32,000 tonnes of gas per day.

==== Cossack Pioneer Floating Production Storage and Off-loading (FPSO) ====
The facility was commissioned in late 1995 and as of 2008 was producing up to 50,000 barrels per day (7,900 m^{3}/d) of crude oil which is offloaded via a flexible line to oil tankers moored astern. Located 34 km (21 mi) east of the North Rankin A platform, it is moored to a riser turret connected by flexible flowlines to subsea production wells at the Wanaea, Cossack, Lambert and Hermes gas fields. It has a storage capacity of 1.15 million barrels (183,000 m^{3}) of oil and a production capacity of 150,000 barrels (24,000 m^{3}) of oil per day.

In May 2008, Woodside announced plans to replace the 13-year-old vessel, with a view to extending oil output to 2025-2030.

=== Karratha Gas Plant ===
The Karratha Gas Plant (KGP) was built in Karratha in the early 1980s, and commissioned in 1984, with natural gas and fluid coming in from the North Rankin platform. Since then the plant has been expanded several times, with extra facilities built. As of 2018 it was processing gas and fluids from the NWSJV resources to produce up to 18.5 million tonnes per annum of LNG.

As of 2018, the key facilities included:

- Five LNG processing trains
- Two domestic gas trains
- Six condensate stabilisation units
- Three LPG fractionation units
- LPG, LNG, and condensate storage facilities
- Two jetties for export of condensate, LPG and LNG
- Power generation and supporting utilities
- Emergency, operational and storage and loading flares
- Two subsea pipelines, described as 1TL and 2TL, within state waters and crossing onshore to KGP
- An offsite supply base, described as the King Bay Supply Facility (KBSF), used for diesel storage, refuelling, etc.
- Associated infrastructure

== Production and sales ==
=== Exports ===
The first LNG shipments went to Japan in 1989. Two hundred shipments per year (about one shipment every 1.5 days) in the purpose-built LNG carriers totalling more than seven million tons were being made around the world in 2008. Markets include sales to long-term customers in Japan as well as spot buyers in China, Spain, South Korea, and the United States.

In 2002, a contract was signed to supply 3 million tonnes of LNG a year from the North West Shelf Venture to China. The contract was worth $25 billion: between $700 million and $1 billion a year for 25 years. The price was guaranteed not to increase until 2031, and, as international LNG prices were increasing, by 2015 China was paying one-third as were Australian consumers.

=== Domestic use ===
The venture was in 2008 WA's largest single producer of domestic gas, providing about 65% of total state production. Pipeline gas is processed at the consortium's Karratha facility, and transported to customers in southern WA via the 1,530-kilometre (950 mi) Dampier to Bunbury Natural Gas Pipeline. A subsidiary company, North West Shelf Gas Pty Ltd, was as of 2008 marketing the domestic gas component to customers in Western Australia through private contracts and sales to Alinta.

WA is not connected to the National Electricity Market nor to gas pipelines in the eastern states, so gas produced here does not supply any other part of Australia and so does not affect power prices across Australia. WA is the only state or territory that requires gas producers to keep a certain percentage of production (in this case 15%) for domestic use. However, in June 2025, it was supplying far less than this minimum amount.

== Concerns and Controversy ==
=== Indigenous rock art ===
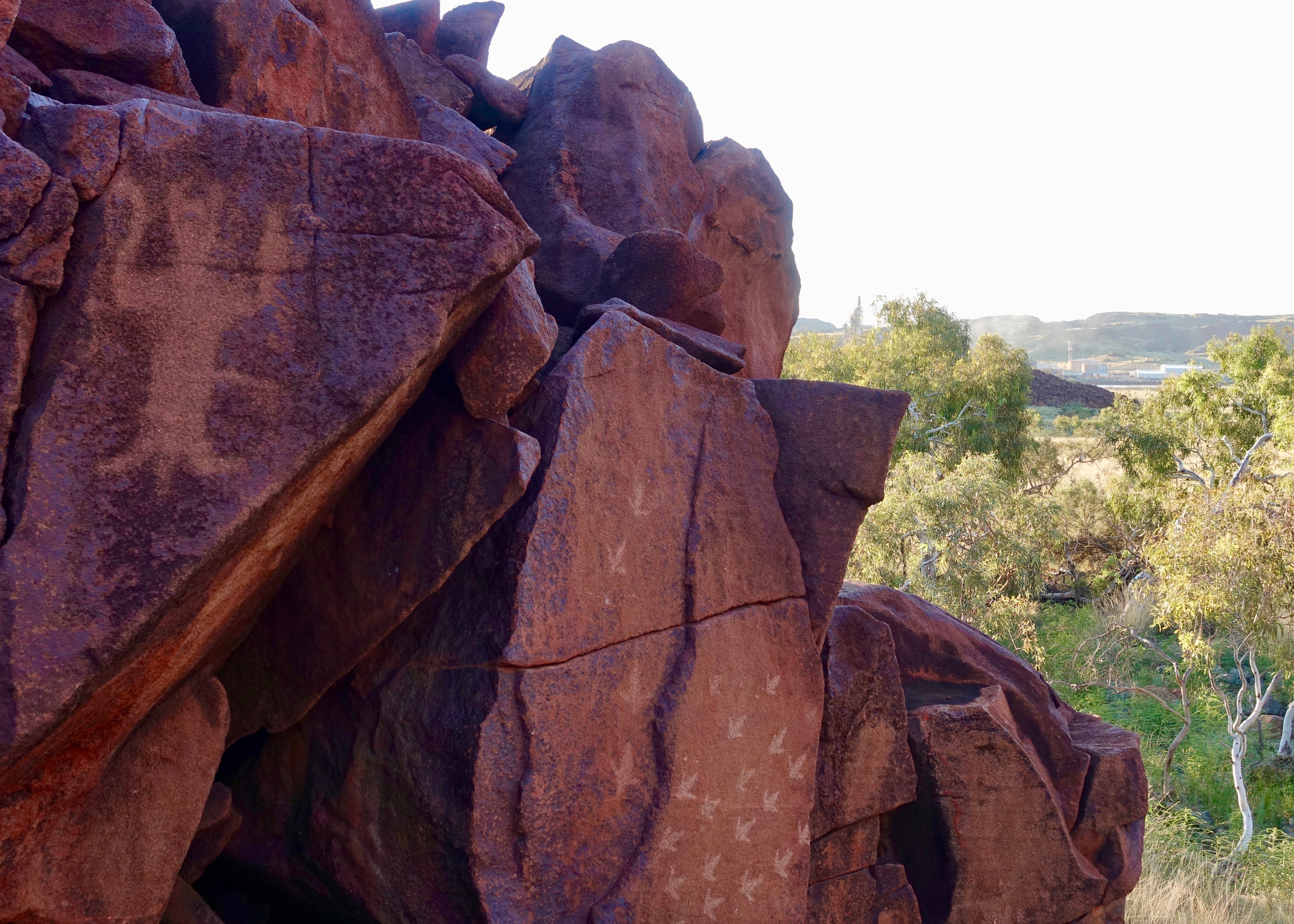

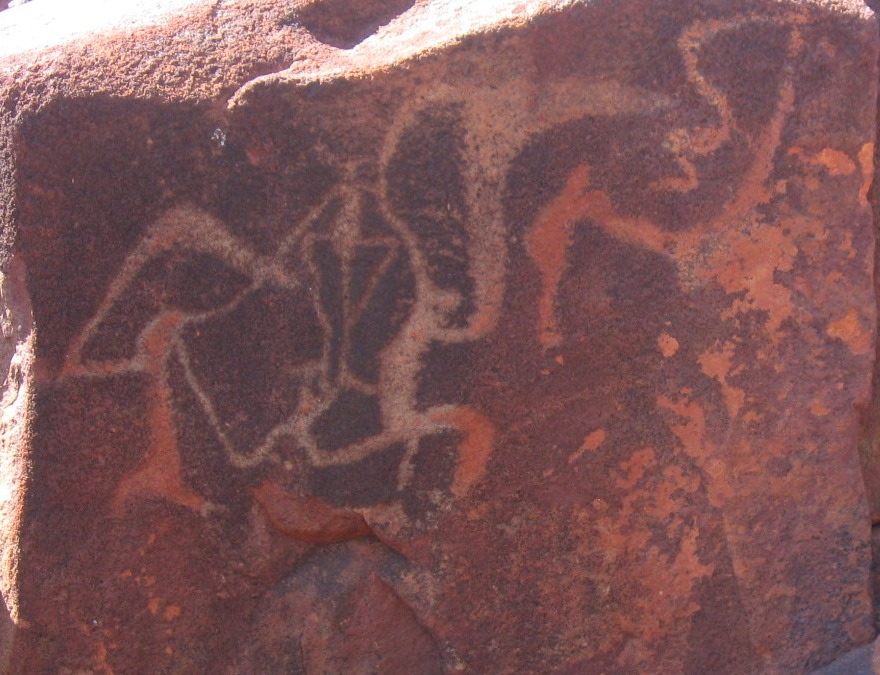

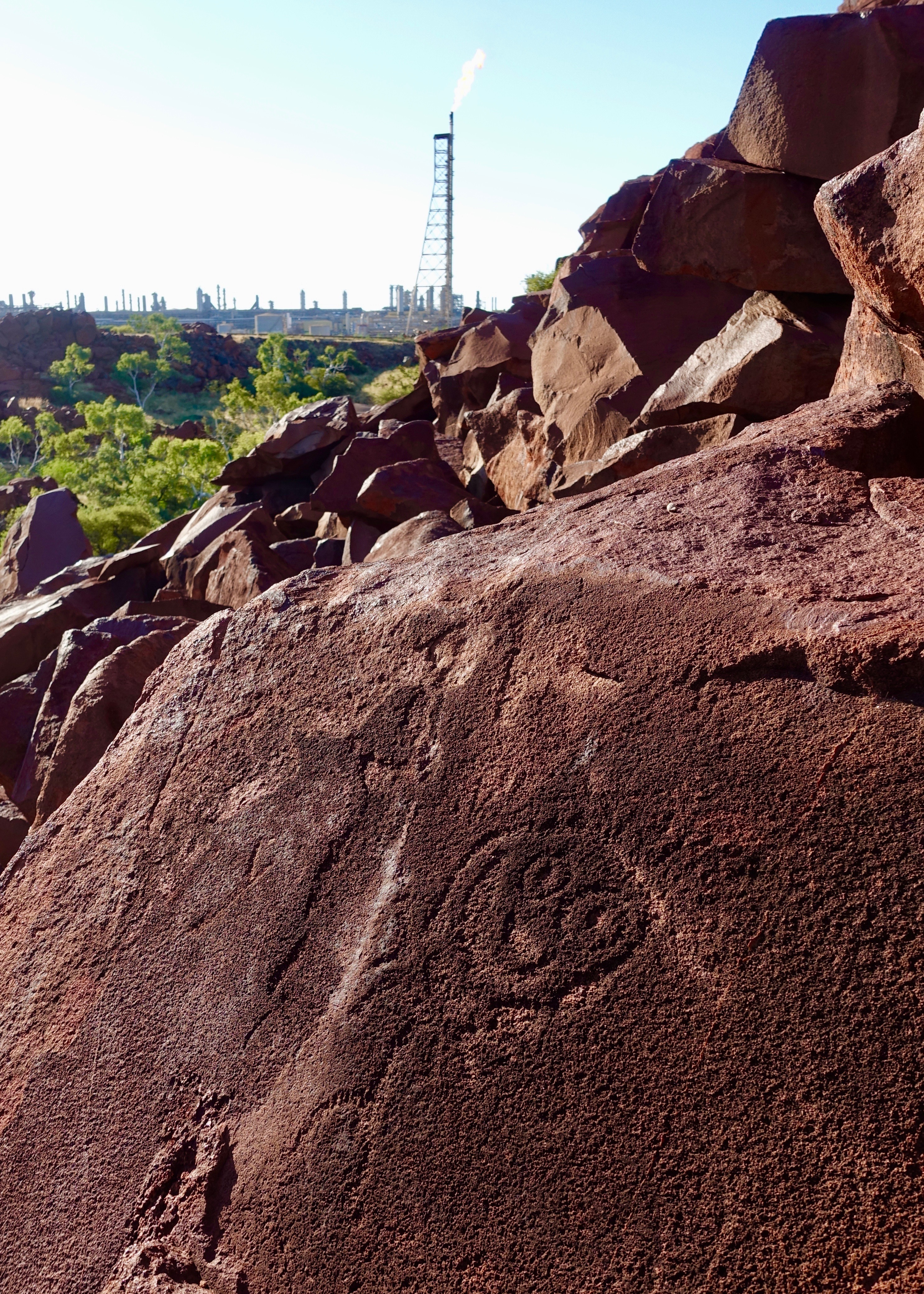

During the construction of the Karratha Gas Plant in the 1980s, it is estimated that 5,000 sacred rock art sites were destroyed. The plant is situated near to a 37,000-hectare (91,000-acre) natural gallery of over a million 50,000-year-old petroglyphs at Murujuga. In 2025 archaeologist Ken Mulvaney described the destruction of rock art for the construction of the North West Shelf, saying that around 5000 petroglyphs recorded by his team had been destroyed by construction of the plant, crushed by bulldozers and dynamited.

An agreement for land access to the area on which the North West Shelf operates was executed in 1998, between the Ngarluma and Yindjibarndi people. Traditional Owners have regularly sought re-negotiation of the agreement, citing that Elders who signed the agreement could not read or write English and thus could not understand nor consent to the agreement.

In 2026, it was revealed that the North West Shelf Land Agreement with Traditional Owners allowed for only $500,000 in compensation for the destruction of rock art and deprivation of access to land and waters.

In 2023, during a speech at the National Press Club, Woodside CEO Meg O'Neill admitted that Woodside had previously destroyed sacred Murujuga rock art during the construction of the Burrup Hub mega-project. This marks the first instance of Woodside publicly accepting responsibility for the destruction of numerous rock art sites on Murujuga. Woodside has previously been implicated in the destruction of thousands of sacred rock art sites during the construction of earlier phases of the Burrup Hub mega-project, including the Karratha Gas Plant and Pluto LNG processing facility. O'Neill characterised the historical removals, some of which occurred as recently as the 21st Century, as "culturally appropriate at the time". In response, Raelene Cooper, a Mardudhunera woman and former chair of the Murujuga Aboriginal Corporation, said: "How can [Meg O'Neill] say it was culturally appropriate - who did Woodside ask for permission, and who gave them cultural authority?"

In May 2025, UNESCO declined to progress the World Heritage Listing of Murujuga, due to the impact of emissions on rock art, and called on Australia to provide more protection for rock art. UNESCO asked the government to "ensure the total removal of degrading acidic emissions" and to develop a decommissioning and rehabilitation plan for the area around the gas plant. World Heritage for Murujuga was later declared, despite global concerns about industrial emissions impacts and the ongoing destruction of rock art sites.

Hearing about the federal government decision to approve the expansion of the gas plant to operate until 2070, Ngarluma-Yindjibarndi woman Kaylene Daniel said that she was very sad, after such a long fight to save the site. "World heritage is what we want and need. We don't want this expansion [of the gas plant]".

In response to the Commonwealth stating its intent to approve the expansion of the North West Shelf, a group of Elders and emerging Traditional Owner (TO) leaders penned a letter to Murray Watt. The letter noted that Watt was intending to approve the gas plant extension without having ever visited Murujuga, and neither he nor any of the state or Commonwealth negotiators had ever met with local Aboriginal people. The letter stated that TOs had never given their consent. TO Samantha Walker again wrote to an open letter to Watt on 29 August 2025, two weeks before he approved the extension of the North West Shelf until 2070, stating that consent had still not been provided for the original construction, let alone the extension. She also wrote of the trauma to her people caused by the destruction of the sacred sites, leading to deterioration of their health, economic wellbeing, and social fabric.

On 12 September 2025 Watt gave final approval for the project, subject to 48 conditions intended to protect the rock art, along with new legal protections. Peter Hicks, chair of the Murujuga Aboriginal Corporation, approved of the section 10 protections but did not comment on the 48 conditions of the commonwealth approval, but Raelene Cooper intends to take legal action against the government on behalf of her people.

Following the approval to extend the North West Shelf Gas Plant until 2070, former WA premier, a conservative politician, Colin Barnett described the North West Shelf project as like a prolonged Juukan Gorge-style destruction of Aboriginal cultural heritage.

=== Environment ===
In 2019, Woodside, and the Joint Venture partners, Chevron, Shell, BP, and Mimi, proposed to extend the life of the North West Shelf project, including the Karratha Gas Plant. The proposal was to extend the life of the project by another 50 years. It is estimated that extending the project by 50 years could result in approximately 4.3 billion tonnes of carbon emissions, with only 8 percent of that aligning with the country's net-zero target by 2050.

The North West Shelf gas project was the single largest industrial emitter in 2020–21, according to the Clean Energy Regulator (CER). In June 2022 the independent Environmental Protection Authority of Western Australia recommended to the Government of Western Australia extending the project's operation until 2070, provided it consistently reduces operational emissions. The EPA's assessment did not include scope 3 emissions, generated from the combustion of the gas, predominantly in Asian countries. This omission implies that North West Shelf customers worldwide will emit approximately 80.19 million tonnes of carbon annually.

In 2023, the Climate Council reported that Woodside was the second-biggest emitter among fossil fuel corporations, after Chevron, having produced 47.5 million tonnes CO22 since 2016. The CER listed Woodside as 7th biggest greenhouse gas-emitter in Australia in the financial year ending 2023.

In December 2024, after a six-year approval period, an extension until 2070 was granted to the project by the state government. However, by April 2025, the Commonwealth government had postponed a decision on the approval of the extension of the North West Shelf until after the 2025 federal election. On 28 May 2025, the same day UNESCO declined the World Heritage Listing due to damage to rock art from emissions, Federal Environmental Minister Murray Watt approved the Gas Plant to operate for another 45 years. This drew heavy criticism from the Traditional Owner community and environmentalists. Watt said that he had not been required to consider the impact on climate change, which is not grounds to refuse or limit a development application under the Environment Protection Biodiversity Conservation Act (EPBC Act). Scientists and environmentalists said that the extra 45 years could add to up to six billion tonnes of greenhouse gases, the majority of which would be emitted after the gas was burned in countries to which it was exported. Larissa Waters, leader of the Australian Greens, said that the decision had meant that there was no prospect of achieving net-zero emissions by 2050. In 2025, the gas plant is the third-largest emitter in Australia. While the environment minister can veto major projects using the EPBC Act, if they would impact "matters of national environmental significance" (including protected plants, animals, and ecosystems), climate change is not a factor in the legislation. There have been calls to change the EPBC Act to include a climate trigger since at least 2005, when Albanese himself (then Shadow Environment Minister) proposed such a measure.

In November 2025, an ABC News investigation revealed that the Western Australian Government had commissioned a “secret” Deloitte report questioning whether the state’s gas exports, including those from the North West Shelf Project, genuinely assist other countries in their energy transitions. The $402,000 report, delivered in early 2025 but not made public, found that while natural gas is often described as a “transition fuel”, it may actually delay the adoption of zero-emission technologies and risk locking importing nations into long-term fossil fuel dependence, undermining their 2050 net-zero commitments. Deloitte’s analysis suggested that demand for Australian gas in key markets such as Japan and South Korea is already declining, and that any remaining growth in China and India is likely to end by the mid-2030s if those countries are to meet decarbonisation targets. The timing of the report drew attention because, shortly before it was completed, the federal government approved an extension of the North West Shelf Project’s operations until 2070. Critics, including opposition and Greens representatives, accused the state government of suppressing evidence that contradicts its public narrative that gas exports support global decarbonisation. The report’s findings cast doubt on the long-term economic and environmental rationale for extending the North West Shelf Project, highlighting potential risks of stranded assets, declining global demand, and reputational damage. They also raise broader questions about transparency, governance, and whether continued investment in large-scale gas infrastructure aligns with Australia’s climate commitments and the interests of affected regional and Indigenous communities. It is noted that the North West Shelf has never paid royalties to the Aboriginal community in which it operates.

=== Satire ===
In 2025 the satirical news site The Betoota Advocate published two tongue-in-cheek pieces lampooning the North West Shelf Project and its extension. One article titled “Government Assures Extending The North West Shelf Gas Project Until 2070 Is Fine As They Will All Be Dead By Then” mocked the decision to prolong the project’s operating life, suggesting that the policymakers who approved it would not live to see the consequences of its climate impacts. The piece framed the extension as emblematic of the “shift the burden to future generations” logic and pointed to criticism from conservation groups and Traditional Owners about the project’s environmental and cultural risks. The second article titled “PM Proves Tanya Plibersek Is A Good Mate Of His By Moving Her Out Of Environment Before Expanding The North West Shelf” satirised the timing of a ministerial reshuffle coinciding with the government’s approval of the extension, casting the move as politically self-serving rather than driven by climate integrity. While comedic and exaggerated, these satires reflect broader public scepticism about the project’s alignment with Australia’s climate goals, transparency of decision-making and commitments to affected Indigenous communities.

In another Betoota Advocate article “Labor Address Concerns Over Rapid Gas-Drilling Expansions: ‘They’ll Do A Welcome To Country First’” delivers a sharp satire of performative corporate and political behaviour surrounding Woodside Energy and the North West Shelf Project. It ridicules the way both the company and government deploy symbolic gestures—such as holding a “Welcome to Country” before new drilling or decorating worksites with rainbow pamphlets during Pride Month—to project cultural sensitivity and inclusivity while continuing large-scale gas expansion. The humour exposes a deeper critique: that these displays of respect and social progressivism are used to mask or morally offset environmentally and culturally destructive practices. By parodying the substitution of ceremony and branding for genuine accountability, the piece underscores how Woodside’s and the government’s public relations strategies amount to performative allyship—using the language and imagery of reconciliation and diversity to legitimise ongoing fossil-fuel extraction and delay meaningful climate action.

== See also ==
- Gorgon gas project
- Wheatstone LNG
- Prelude FLNG
- Petroleum industry in Western Australia
