= Dolphin Island (Western Australia) =

Island of Western Australia

Coordinates: 20°28′28″S 116°51′01″E

Location of Dolphin Island (Western Australia)

Dolphin Island is an island situated in the Dampier Archipelago in the Pilbara region of Western Australia. Visitors are able to camp within 100 metres (328 ft) of the high water mark on all of the beaches on the island except for the south eastern side.

The island is designated as a B Class Nature Reserve (34944) and has a total area of 3,203 hectares (7,915 acres) . It is the second largest island of the archipelago after Enderby Island but it is the highest in the archipelago rising to 120 metres (394 ft) above sea level.

The island is composed of precambrian volcanic and granitic rocks with some outcrops of archaen granite and granite gneiss which are over 2400 Ma in age. The island is separated from the Burrup Peninsula by a major valley system formed by a regional fracture.

Indigenous Australians inhabited the area or utilised the islands of the archipelago for over 18,000 years with the Yapurarra peoples being the traditional owners. The island was named by Francis Thomas Gregory during his 1861 expedition through the Pilbara, the island is named after the ship captained by Gregory.

The pearling industry was established in the archipelago in 1870 and the rock pools on Dolphin Island were used to supply fresh water to the fleet. Six graves on the western side of the island are thought to belong to the pearlers.
