= Mikurrunya Hills =

Hill range in the Pilbara region of Western Australia

Coordinates: 20°22′26″S 118°58′55″E

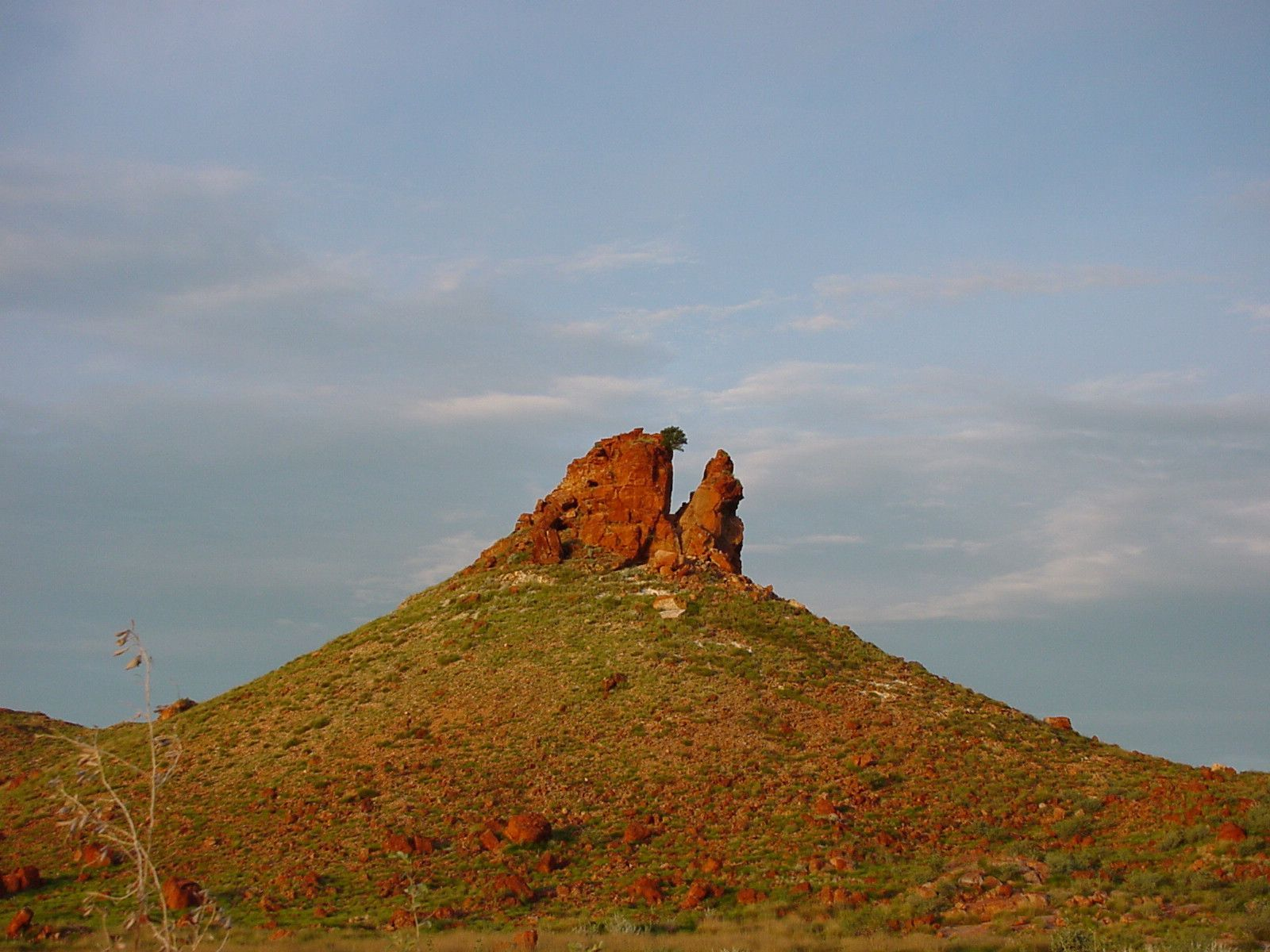
One of the wives in the Mikurrunya dreamtime story

Mikurrunya Hills is a geologic formation situated approximately 50 kilometres (31 mi) east of Port Hedland, near Marble Bar Road at the Strelley turnoff, on Nyangumarta country. Mikurrunya Hills is a registered site on the National Native Title Register through the Department of Indigenous Affairs with site ID 9904, site No. P02286; the register records the native title as belonging to the Ngarla people.

The Nyangumarta people have a dreamtime story of the hills: Mikurri is a man with two wives, and the jealousy of the older wife forced the younger wife to live apart from the family.

The name Mikurrunya was also that of the tri-lingual newsletter the Strelley Aboriginal community school produced in the 1970s.
