= Algy Paterson =

Last fluent speaker of the Martuthunira language

Algy Paterson (died 6 August 1995) was the last fluent speaker of the Martuthunira language of Western Australia.

Algy's father was a European, which made him eligible to be removed from his family by the authorities under the policy now known as the Stolen Generation. His family avoided this by hiding in the bush, where they lived a traditional nomadic lifestyle. Algy grew up speaking Martuthunira and Kurrama, and did not learn any English until he was fifteen.

From 1980 he worked with the linguist Alan Dench to preserve the Martuthunira language in writing.

== See also ==
- Kurrama people
- Language death
