= Ngarluma =

Indigenous Western Australian people

The Ngarluma are an Indigenous Australian people of the western Pilbara area of northwest Australia. They are coastal dwellers of the area around Roebourne and Karratha, excluding Millstream.

== Language ==
The Ngarluma language belongs to the Ngayarda branch of the Pama-Nyungan family. It is a highly inflected suffixing language, with, unusually, a nominative-accusative case-marking system, with verbs inflected for tense, aspect and mood. The Ngarluma on contact with whites and distant tribes appeared to have reserved their grammatically complex language for conversations among themselves while adopting a simplified version when interacting with strangers.

There are an estimated 20 full speakers, most of whom are elderly.

== History ==
It would appear that the Ngarluma adapted quickly to the developing pearling industry along the northwest coast, perhaps travelling down to get work at Cossack 300 miles south. This hypothesis is based on the fact that the vocabulary list provided to a priest in 1875 by two Dalmatian Italian shipwreck survivors, Michele Bacich and Giovanni Iurich, after they returned to Italy, appears to be a creole with a strong but simplified component of Ngarluma. It is thought that they were extended hospitality for three months by the Yinikutira people who had picked up the creole from indentured Ngarluma labourers in the pearling industry.

== Kinship system ==
The Ngarluma people have a four group skin system.

Banaga	Balyirri
Burungu	Garimarra

== Some words ==
- t(h)artaruga = sea turtle. This might be a loanword predating the Western discovery of the continent of Australia.

In a number of Pilbara languages such as Ngarluma, Ngarla, Kariyarra Yinjibarndi and Nyamal, the turtle is called tartaruga/thartaruga. This happens to be identical to the Portuguese word for that creature, and there is a grounded suspicion that the common term must reflect some otherwise unattested interception of Portuguese sailors prior to the advent of the Dutch on the northwestern coast. The data, and theorization of some such contact, was gathered and advanced by Carl Georg von Brandenstein, who hypothesized that there must have been a secret Portuguese colony established in the area around the 1520s, which lasted for 60 years. The need for secrecy stemmed, in this hypothesis, from the consequences of the Treaty of Tordesillas which divided the New World into Spanish and Portuguese imperial zones. Von Brandenstein thought that, given the quarrels between the two nations over the boundaries and extension of these lines of demarcation, the Portuguese might have kept their discovery of Australia and colonization of the coastal area of the Pilbara, secret until the Portuguese succession crisis of 1580 led to the regency of the Spanish king Philip II, after which the colony ended. This etymology has strong claims, unlike the rest of the hypothesis.

== Native title ==
In 2005, the Ngarluma people's native title rights were recognised by the Federal Court of Australia. Ngarluma Aboriginal Corporation, based in Karratha, administer the Ngarluma's native title rights and interests.

The Ngarluma determination area covers land and waters in the Pilbara region of Western Australia, including areas around Karratha and the Burrup Peninsula. The court recognised that the Ngarluma people hold non-exclusive native title rights and interests over parts of the determination area, including rights to access, camp, hunt, fish, and conduct cultural activities in accordance with traditional laws and customs.

Since 1998, before any native title determination, the Ngarluma people, alongside the Yindjibarndi people, have been a party to the land access agreement for the Woodside-operated North West Shelf Project. The North West Shelf Project, which includes the Karratha gas plant, was built in the late 1970s and early 1980s on the Burrup Peninsula. Under the agreement, Ngarluma people remain the traditional owner representatives for the North West Shelf Project area.

In 1998, the Ngarluma and Yindjibarndi elders established the Ngarluma Yindjibarndi Foundation Ltd (NYFL) as the traditional owner representative body for the North West Shelf land and waters. NYFL continues to operate out of Roebourne, the contemporary heartland of the Ngarluma people. NYFL delivers social, cultural and economic benefits for the Ngarluma and Yindjibarndi people, and the broader Aboriginal community. NYFL does not receive royalties from the Woodside-operated North West Shelf project.

NYFL is led by a board of directors made up by Ngarluma and Yindjibarndi people, including Michael Woodley and Josephine Samson as chair and deputy, and former ASX top 20 corporate leader and social impact practitioner, Sean-Paul Stephens as CEO.

Ngarluma people, alongside four other traditional owner groups, are also a party to the Burrup and Maitland Industrial Estates Agreement (BMIEA). The BMIEA area includes the Woodside-operated Pluto gas plant, Yarra fertiliser operations, and other industrial projects.

== Sources ==
- "AIATSIS map of Indigenous Australia". AIATSIS. 14 May 2024.
- Brandenstein, Carl Georg; Churnside, Bob (1970). Narratives from the North-west of Western Australia in the Ngarluma and Jindjiparndi Languages: Narratives 1-36. Australian Institute of Aboriginal Studies.
- Dixon, Sally; Deek, Eleonora (2010). "Language centre as language revitalization strategy: a case study from the Pilbara". In Hobson, John; Lowe, Kevin; Poetsach, Susan; Walsh, Michael (eds.). Re-awakening Languages: Theory and Practice in the Revitalisation of Australia's Indigenous Languages. Sydney University Press. pp. 119–139. ISBN 978-1-920-89955-4.
- Edmunds, Mary (2013). A Good Life: Human Rights and Encounters with Modernity. Australian National University. ISBN 978-1-922-14467-6.
- McConvell, Patrick; Simpson, Jane (2012). "Fictive Motion Down Under: The Locative-Allative Case Alternative in Some Australian Indigenous Languages". In Santos, Diana; Lindén, Krister; Ng'ang'a, Wanjiku (eds.). Shall We Play the Festschrift Game?: Essays on the Occasion of Lauri Carlson's 60th Birthday. Springer. pp. 159–179. ISBN 978-1-920-89955-4.
- Meakins, Felicity (2014). "Language contact varieties". In Koch, Harold; Nordlinger, Rachel (eds.). The Languages and Linguistics of Australia: A Comprehensive Guide. Walter de Gruyter. pp. 365–415. ISBN 978-3-110-27977-1.
- Mühlhäusler, Peter; McGregor, William (1996). "Post-contact languages of Western Australia". In Wurm, Stephen A.; Mühlhäusler, Peter; Tryon, Darrell T. (eds.). Atlas of Languages of Intercultural Communication in the Pacific, Asia, and the Americas. Vol. 1. Walter de Gruyter. pp. 101–121. ISBN 978-3-110-81972-4.
- Ngarluma Dictionary: English-Ngarluma Wordlist and Topical Wordlists (PDF). Wanga Maya Pilbara Aboriginal Language Centre. 2008. ISBN 978-1-921312-73-1. Archived from the original (PDF) on 11 October 2017.
- "Tindale Tribal Boundaries" (PDF). Department of Aboriginal Affairs, Western Australia. September 2016. Archived from the original (PDF) on 8 March 2016.
