= Yapurarra =

Aboriginal people from the Pilbara, Western Australia

The Yapurarra or Jaburara, also rendered Yaburara, are an Aboriginal Australian people whose traditional lands are in the Pilbara region of Western Australia and the Dampier Archipelago.

== Language ==
The Jaburara language (Yaburarra) is thought to have been similar to Ngarluma, part of the Ngayarda languages.

== Country ==
The Jaburara owned some 520 square kilometres (200 mi^{2}) of territory from around Dampier, Burrup, Nichol Bay and the peninsula northwards to the Dolphin and Legendre islands.

== Early contact ==
During one of Phillip Parker King's voyages on HMS Mermaid to survey the Australian coast, an attempt was made to communicate in February 1817 with members of the tribe, three of whom had been sighted off-shore floating on a log in the vicinity of present-day Karratha. The intermediary used was the ship's interpreter Bungaree, who, speaking the Broken Bay Dharug language could not understand them, but managed to calm their anxieties by undressing and showing he wore ritual scars.

== Resistance and extinction ==
The Jaburara, together with other local tribes such as the Ngarluma and Mardu-Dunera, fought against the colonization of their lands by white settlers. According to an American whaler at the time, the law that accompanied settlement in their region could be summed up as "a word and a blow: the blow, which is generally fatal, coming first". In 1868, near the present-day township of Roebourne, in an area known in the local language as Murujuga, two policemen and a native tracker had been killed. The suspects, three Jaburara men, were duly caught and sentenced to imprisonment. Two parties, made up of north coast pearlers and settler pastoralists, had been given permission by the district authority to apply lethal force "with discretion and judgement", and they attacked Jaburara encampments in a pincer movement. In what is now known as the Flying Foam massacre it has been estimated that up to 60 Jaburara were killed. In one camp alone, some 15 were killed. Following the La Grange massacre, this episode constitutes the second known example of the use of massacre to forcibly remove an indigenous north western population. One small "family" was recorded in the first half of the 20th century as still surviving but the massacre effectively cut off the tribe's connections to the islands.

== Heritage ==
The Jaburara heritage is attested by rock quarries, extensive archaic petroglyphs, grindstones used by native women to make flour from native seeds, nomadic camps, and middens to be found along the Jaburara Heritage Trail, which winds through an area containing some of the most extensive remains of ancient Aboriginal rock art, some dating back 25,000 years.

== Alternative names ==
- Jaburara-ngaluma (northern Ngaluma)
- Jaburrara-ngarluma
- Madoitja (perhaps)

== Notes and references ==
=== References ===
- "AIATSIS map of Indigenous Australia". AIATSIS. 10 November 2022.
- "Tindale Tribal Boundaries" (PDF). Department of Aboriginal Affairs, Western Australia. September 2016. Archived from the original (PDF) on 8 March 2016.
- Flood, Josephine (1999). The Riches of Ancient Australia: An Indispensable Guide for Exploring Prehistoric Australia (3rd ed.). University of Queensland Press. ISBN 978-0-702-23083-7.
- Gara, Tom (1983). "The Flying Foam Massacre: An Incident on the North-west Frontier". In Smith, Moya (ed.). Archaeology at ANZAAS. Western Australian Museum. pp. 86–94.
- Gibbs, Martin (2010). The Shore Whalers of Western Australia: Historical Archaeology of a Maritime Frontier. Sydney University Press. ISBN 978-0-855-64181-8.
- Knafla, Louis A. (2016). "Policing Aboriginal People on the Settler Frontier". In Nettelbeck, Amanda; Smandych, Russell; Knafla, Louis A. (eds.). Fragile Settlements: Aboriginal Peoples, Law, and Resistance in South-West Australia and Prairie Canada. University of British Columbia Press. pp. 62–83. ISBN 978-0-774-83091-1.
- Shellam, Tiffany (2015). "Mediating Encounters through bodies and talk". In Konishi, Shino; Nugent, Maria; Shellam, Tiffany (eds.). Indigenous Intermediaries: New perspectives on exploration archives. Australian National University Press. pp. 85–102. ISBN 978-1-925-02277-3.
- Stannage, Tom (1981). A New History of Western Australia. University of West Australia Press. ISBN 978-0-855-64181-8.
- Taylor, John; Scambary, B. (2005). Indigenous People and the Pilbara Mining Boom: A Baseline for Regional Participation. Australian National University Press. ISBN 978-1-920-94254-0.
- Thieberger, Nicholas (1993). Handbook of Western Australian Aboriginal Languages South of the Kimberley Region. Department of Linguistics, Research School of Pacific Studies.
- Tindale, Norman Barnett (1974). Aboriginal Tribes of Australia: Their Terrain, Environmental Controls, Distribution, Limits, and Proper Names. Australian National University Press. ISBN 978-0-708-10741-6. Archived from the original on 20 March 2020.
- Van Driesum, Rob (2002). Outback Australia. Lonely Planet. ISBN 9781864501872.
- Veth, Peter (17 December 2015). "Exile in the Kingdom: The Struggle for Cultural Heritage in the Pilbara". Cultural Anthropology. Archived from the original on 30 May 2016.
- Walsh, Aileen (17 December 2015). "A History of Forced Removal: Diminishing Returns in the Northwest of Western Australia". Cultural Anthropology. Archived from the original on 9 October 2016.
