= Tracy Westerman =

Australian psychologist (born 1970)

Dr Tracy Westerman AM
- Born: 7 March 1970 (age 56); Pilbara, Western Australia, Australia
- Education: Curtin University (MPsych, PsyD)
- Occupation: Clinical psychologist
- Organizations: Indigenous Psychological Services; The Westerman Jilya Institute for Indigenous Mental Health

Tracy Westerman AM is an Indigenous Australian psychologist and writer, and the 2018 Australian of the Year for Western Australia. She is also the first Aboriginal person to earn a combined Masters and PhD in clinical psychology.

== Early life ==
Westerman is an Indigenous Nyamal woman. She was born in Carnarvon, Western Australia, and is the youngest of five siblings. Her parents met in Port Headland. Westerman's mother, a Nyamal woman, worked as a shearer's cook. Her father, a white man, worked as a ringer on a cattle station. He refused his wages when his Aboriginal colleagues at the same station were not being paid.

Due to being Indigenous, Westerman's mother was required to attend court in Port Headland to be granted a citizenship certificate in 1964, since Indigenous peoples in Western Australia at the time were not automatically Australian citizens. Instead, under the Western Australian Natives (Citizenship Rights) Act of 1944, her mother was required to prove she was physically healthy, could speak English, had severed ties with Indigenous family members, and that she was of "good behaviour and reputation", in order to be granted citizenship.

Westerman grew up in the Pilbara region of Western Australia. Her family moved multiple times during her childhood, including to a station and to Useless Loop, a town in the shire of Shark Bay. Later, her family moved to Tom Price, a mining town where she completed her primary and secondary education. She completed her Year 11 and Year 12 studies through School of the Air. Westerman aspired to become a psychologist since she was a child.

== Education ==
Westerman completed a graduate diploma in psychology. In 2003, Westerman became the first Indigenous person in Australia to earn a combined Masters and PhD in clinical psychology. She did her tertiary studies in Perth, completing her postgraduate education at Curtin University.

== Career ==
At age 22, Westerman worked in child welfare in Kalgoorlie and Western Desert communities.

=== Organisations and programs ===
In 1998, Westerman founded Indigenous Psychological Services (IPS). She created the business to address the lack of culturally competent mental healthcare available to Indigenous peoples, and due to the lack of government funding. As of 2026, Westerman has trained over 50,000 practitioners. The business has never received government funding.

In 2019, Westerman started the Dr Tracy Westerman Indigenous Psychology Scholarship Program, funded using $50,000 of her own money. The scholarship supports Indigenous undergraduate and postgraduate psychology students studying at Curtin University, Westerman's alma mater.

Westerman subsequently founded the The Westerman Jilya Institute for Indigenous Mental Health, an Indigenous-led not-for-profit organisation which aims to improve healthcare outcomes for Aboriginal and Torres Strait Islander peoples. Jilya means "my child" in the Nyamal language. Westerman decided to form the institute following a 2018 coronial inquest into a cluster of suicides in the Kimberley region of Western Australia, in which thirteen (Note: In a coronial inquest, 12 of the deaths were determined to be suicides and one had an open finding.) Indigenous children and young people died.

The Westerman Jilya Institute offers scholarships, mentoring and supervision to Indigenous people working and studying in the field of psychology, as well as delivering healthcare and performing research into culturally safe practices for Indigenous peoples. As of 2026, the Westerman Jilya Institute has supported 64 Indigenous psychology students. Westerman has personally raised over $9 million and donated 15,000 volunteer hours.

=== Research ===
Westerman has published several journal articles on cross cultural psychology, culturally informed practice, racial trauma and suicide prevention. She has worked to develop culturally valid assessment tools for Aboriginal Australians, such as the Acculturation Scale for Aboriginal Australians and the Racial Trauma Treatment Triad.

Westerman also developed a screening tool called the Westerman Aboriginal Symptom Checklist Youth (WASC-Y), which was the first unique screening tool made specifically for Aboriginal young people.

In 2005, the government of Canada sent a delegation to Australia to look at Westerman's work on suicide prevention in Indigenous communities. On the delegation's recommendation, these prevention strategies have since been used in Canada, to support Indigenous peoples of Canada. The Government of Nunavut Task Force on Mental Health examined the potential of implementing the WASC-Y in assessments of Indigenous use in Nunavut in 2006.

Additionally, she created the first national database for mental health and suicide behaviours in Indigenous youth.

=== Writing ===
In 2024, Westerman published a memoir titled Jilya: How one Indigenous woman from the remote Pilbara transformed psychology (sometimes shortened to Jilya). The University of Queensland Press acquired the international rights to her book.

Westerman has been a guest writer of multiple articles for the news website National Indigenous Times. Her opinion articles have focused on Aboriginal families and child protection in Western Australia, as well as suicide in Indigenous communities. She has also written several articles for IndigenousX on Indigenous suicides and the age of criminal responsibility.

== Awards and honours ==
Westerman was named the 2018 Australian of the Year for Western Australia. Through winning the award, she was invited to deliver a keynote address at the State Library of Western Australia, where she spoke about suicide in Indigenous youth. In 2026, she was once again nominated for WA Australian of the Year.

In 2018, Westerman was inducted into the Western Australia Women's Hall of Fame. The same year, she won the Lifetime Achievement Award at the Curtin University Alumni Awards.

In 2021, she was appointed a member of the Order of Australia.

Westerman won the Australian Psychological Society Altmetrics Award in 2022 for her journal article, Culture-bound syndromes in Aboriginal Australian populations. The award is for the article which earnt the highest Altmetric Attention Score across select Australian psychological journals. Westerman's article analysed culturally bound phenomena in Indigenous populations in Australia.

Westerman's book, Jilya, has won several awards. In 2025, the book won the UTS Glenda Adams Award for New Writing at the New South Wales Premier's Literary Awards. It was also shortlisted for both the Indigenous Writers' Prize at the NSW Premier's Literary Awards, and the Non-Fiction Book of the Year at the Western Australian Premier's Book Awards in 2025.

For her business, Indigenous Psychological Services, Westerman won the Western Australia Small Business award at the Telstra Business Women's Award in 2020.

== Advocacy and political views ==
In 2023, Westerman publicly supported the Yes vote in the 2023 Australian Indigenous Voice referendum.

In 2024, Westerman criticised the Country Liberal Party's decision to lower the age of criminal responsibility in the Northern Territory to from 12 years old to 10 years old.

== Personal life ==
Westerman's mother lives in Karratha, and her father died at age 60 from bowel cancer.
