= Martuthunira language =

Extinct Australian Aboriginal language

Martuthunira
- Pronunciation: [maɽʊðʊneɻa]
- Region: Western Australia
- Ethnicity: Mardudunera
- Extinct: 6 August 1995, with the death of Algy Paterson
- Language family: Pama–Nyungan: Ngayarta; Martuthunira

Language codes
- ISO 639-3: vma
- Glottolog: mart1255
- AIATSIS: W35
- ELP: Martuthunira

Martuthunira is an extinct Australian Aboriginal language, the traditional language of the Martuthunira people of Western Australia.

The last fluent speaker of Martuthunira, Algy Paterson, died on 6 August 1995. From 1980 he worked with the linguist Alan Dench to preserve Martuthunira in writing. Most of the understanding of the language comes from their work.

== Name ==
The name Martuthunira, pronounced [maɽʊðʊneɻa] by native speakers, means "those who live around the Fortescue River". It has many spelling variants, including: Maratunia, Mardadhunira, Mardathon, Mardathoni, Mardathoonera, Mardatuna, Mardatunera, Mardudhoonera, Mardudhunera, Mardudhunira, Mardudjungara, Marduduna, Mardudunera, Marduthunira, Mardutunera, Mardutunira, Marduyunira, Martuthinya, and Martuyhunira.

== Classification ==
Martuthunira is classified as a member of the Ngayarta branch of the Pama–Nyungan languages. Under Carl Georg von Brandenstein's 1967 classification, Martuthunira was classed as a Coastal Ngayarda language, but the separation of the Ngayarda languages into Coastal and Inland groups is no longer considered valid.

== Phonology ==
Martuthunira has a fairly standard Australian phonology. R. M. W. Dixon uses it as a prototypical example in his 2002 book Australian Languages: Their nature and development.

=== Consonants ===
	Peripheral		Laminal		Apical	
	Bilabial	Velar	Palatal	Dental	Alveolar	Retroflex
Plosive	p	k	c	t̪	t	ʈ
Nasal	m	ŋ	ɲ	n̪	n	ɳ
Lateral			ʎ ~ ᶡʎ	l̪ ~ ᵈ̪l̪	l ~ ᵈl	ɭ ~ 𐞋ɭ
Rhotic					r	ɻ
Semivowel	w		j			

The laterals—but perhaps uniquely not the nasals—are allophonically prestopped.

The laminal stop /c/ has a voiced allophone [ɟ] between vowels.

Between vowels, the dental stop /t̪/ can become [d̪], [ð], [ð̞], [ɻ], [j], [w], or even simply a syllable break. In some words one particular realization is always used, in others there is free variation.

The alveolar stop /t/ has a voiced allophone [d] after a nasal. It occurs between vowels only in a handful of words, probably all loanwords, where it has a longer period of closure than the other stops [tː].

The retroflex stop /ʈ/ has a voiced allophone [ɖ] after a nasal, and a flapped allophone [ɽ] between vowels.

Besides the voiced allophones mentioned above, stops are usually voiceless and unaspirated.

The laterals have prestopped allophones [ᶜʎ ᵗ̪l̪ ᵗl ^{ʈ}ɭ] when they occur in a syllable coda.

The alveolar rhotic /r/ is a tap [ɾ] between vowels, and a usually voiceless trill [r̥] finally.

The palatal semivowel /j/ may be dropped initially before /i/, but the equivalent dropping of /w/ before initial /u/ is rare.

=== Vowels ===
	Front	Back
High	i iː	u uː
Low	a aː	

/i/ is usually realised as [ɪ], though it may be realised as [i] near palatal consonants and as [e] near /r/, /n/ or /l/.

/iː/ is realised as [ɪː] in morpheme-initial syllables, [eː] elsewhere.

/u/ is usually realised as [u] in stressed syllables, and [ʊ] in unstressed syllables. /u/ is fronted to varying degrees when near laminal consonants, being most fronted [ʉ] when preceded by a dental consonant. It has an unrounded allophone [ɨ] when followed by /ɻ/.

/uː/ is usually [ʊː], but is lowered to [ɔː] when preceded by a dental consonant.

/a/ is usually [ɐ] when stressed, [ə] when unstressed. Following a laminal consonant, more so after dentals than palatals, it is fronted towards [ɛ]. When preceded by /w/ and followed by a velar consonant, it is realised as [ɒ].

/aː/ is usually simply [ɐː].

=== Phonotactics ===
All Martuthunira words begin with one of the following consonants, from most to least frequent: /p k m w ŋ c t̪ j ɲ n̪/. This consists of only peripheral and laminal stops, nasals, and semivowels. Words may end in a vowel, or one of /n r l ɲ ɳ ʎ ɭ/.

== Grammar ==
=== Accusative alignment ===
Accusative alignment. A = subject of a transitive verb; S = subject of an intransitive verb; O = object of a transitive verb.

Unlike most Australian languages, which exhibit ergativity, Martuthunira and the other Ngayarta languages have an accusative alignment. That is, the subjects of transitive verbs are treated the same as the subjects of intransitive verbs, while the objects are treated differently.

The Martuthunira nominative case is unmarked (zero). The accusative case, which descends from a suffix that originally marked the dative case, takes the form /-ŋu/ on proper nominals; /-ku/ on common nominals ending in a nasal (/ɲ n ɳ/); /-ju/ on common nominals ending in a lateral or a rhotic (/ʎ l ɭ r/); and vowel lengthening for common nominals ending in vowels. The accusative case is identical to the genitive case, except for common nominals ending in vowels, where the genitive suffix is /-wu/.

=== Case stacking ===
Martuthunira exhibits case stacking, where nouns take multiple case suffixes for agreement. For example:

Ngayu nhawulha ngurnu tharnta-a mirtily-marta-a thara-ngka-marta-a.
I saw that euro-ACC joey-PROP-ACC pouch-LOC-PROP-ACC
I saw that euro with a joey in its pouch.

- Tharnta is the object of the verb, and so is in the accusative case.
- Mirtily gets a proprietive suffix, which indicates that it is possessed by the euro. However, because it modifies tharnta, it additionally gets an accusative suffix to agree with it.
- Thara gets a locative suffix, which indicates that it is what the joey is in. It also gets a proprietive suffix to agree with mirtily, and then an accusative suffix to agree with tharnta.
