= Nyamal =

Indigenous people of Western Australia

The Nyamal are an Indigenous Australian people of the Pilbara area of north-western Western Australia.

== Language ==
A version of Nyamal became the basis of a pidgin used among workers on pearling luggers in the late 19th century, and was spoken several hundred miles away, as was Ngarluma One Nyamal word has entered English, kaluta, the common term now used to refer to a distinct species of marsupial Dasukaluta rosamondae, mistakenly classified as an antechinus before it was correctly identified in 1982.

== Country ==
The Nyamal are a coastal people though their traditional lands extend inland through to the Yarrie country of the De Grey River, the name yari denoting the white ochre on the river banks. It extended east of the Karajarri coastal zone, and from Port Hedland through to Marble Bar and Nullagine, south over the Shaw River, and north over the Oakover River to the borders of Martu tribal lands such as those of the Manyjilyjarra, Wanman, Nyangumarta and Ngarla. Norman Tindale (Note: Tindale's estimates particularly for the peoples of the Western desert are not considered to be accurate.) estimated their territorial extension as covering 16,300 square miles (42,000 km^{2}). (Note: 'On the Coongan and Shaw rivers to their headwaters and on the lower reaches of the de Grey River west of Barramine almost to Mulyie and Wodgina; at Marble Bar, Nullagine, Hillside, Bamboo Springs, and Warrawoona. They claim access to the sea on a narrow strip following the Tabba Tabba Creek through Strelley and Pippingarra.')

Bush tucker included mangkurrka cuts from the Punara tree. Two types of kangaroo were hunted, the plain variety (warrinykura) and a hill species (wijunu). The lure of the native fig tee fruit was used to catch both bush turkey, which was trapped in a grass net splayed out in the branches, and emu, which was enticed through an artificial gap in a contrived hedge of bush shrubs, and then fell into spiked ditches dug and then camouflaged with leafage and sand.

== History ==
Part of the traditional Nyamal lands around the de Grey river were taken up by the pastoralist Walter Padbury in 1863, and, after conditions proved too arduous for his foreman Nairn, the station changed hands, and was managed by McKenzie Grant, A.W. Anderson and, later, Charles Harper. Eventually local survivors found work, on the new pastoral leases where a white jackaroo could earn £5 a month. In 1885 they sheared over 13,000 sheep in a month and a half, not paid for in wages, but with flour, sugar and tobacco. Vast flocks of sheep ate up the grasses and bush tucker resources that had been one of the staples of people like the Nyamal, forcing them into more dependence on the stations.

== Notable people ==
- Peter Coppin (1920 - 2006), Elder and activist.
- Clancy McKenna (1909 - 1979) activist and community leader.
- Putangaja Ernie Mitchell (c. 1900 - 1970), Elder and activist.
- Tracy Westerman, clinical psychologist and 2018 WA Australian of the Year.

== Notes and references ==
=== Sources ===
- "AIATSIS map of Indigenous Australia". AIATSIS. 14 May 2024.
- "Tindale Tribal Boundaries" (PDF). Department of Aboriginal Affairs, Western Australia. September 2016.
- Coppin, Peter; Read, Jolly (2010) [First published 1999]. Kangkushot: The life of Nyamal lawman Peter Coppin. Aboriginal Studies Press. ISBN 978-1-922-05963-5.
- McConvell, Patrick (2010). "Contact and Indigenous Languages in Australia". In Hickey, Raymond (ed.). The Handbook of Language Contact. John Wiley & Sons. pp. 770–793. ISBN 978-1-405-17580-7.
- Moore, Bruce (2001). "Australian English and Indigenous Voices". In Blair, David; Collins, Peter (eds.). English in Australia. John Benjamins Publishing. pp. 133–150. ISBN 978-9-027-29799-0.
- Tindale, Norman Barnett (1974). "Njamal (WA)". Aboriginal Tribes of Australia: Their Terrain, Environmental Controls, Distribution, Limits, and Proper Names. Australian National University. ISBN 978-0-708-10741-6. Archived from the original on 20 March 2020.
- Tonkinson, Robert (1989). "Local Organisation and Land Tenure in the Karlamilyi (Rudall River) Region" (PDF). In Western Desert Working Group (ed.). The significance of the Karlamilyi Region to the Martujarra people of the Western Desert. Perth: Department of Conservation and Land Management. pp. 99–259.
