= Nyamal language =

Australian Aboriginal language

Nyamal
- Region: Pilbara, Western Australia
- Native speakers: 20 (2005) to 45 Nyamal (2021 census)
- Language family: Pama–Nyungan: Ngayarta; Nyamal
- Dialects: Nyamal; Widugari

Language codes
- ISO 639-3: nly
- Glottolog: nyam1271
- AIATSIS: A58 Nyamal, A60 Witukari
- ELP: Nyamal

Nyamal is an Australian Aboriginal language spoken by the Nyamal people in the Pilbara region of Western Australia.

== Phonology ==
=== Consonants ===
	Peripheral		Laminal		Apical	
	Labial	Velar	Dental	Palatal	Alveolar	Retroflex
Plosive	p	k	t̪	ɟ	t	ʈ
Nasal	m	ŋ	n̪	ɲ	n	ɳ
Rhotic					ɾ ~ r	
Lateral			l̪	ʎ	l	ɭ
Approximant	w			j		ɻ

=== Vowels ===
	Front	Central	Back
High	i iː		u uː
Low		a aː	

Vowels /a, i, u/ often appear as [ə, ɪ, ʊ].

== Kinship terms ==
Nyamal has a typologically rare system of kinship terms. The kinship terms in Nyamal identify the sex of the relative, the generation they belong to (relative to the speaker), as well as their moiety, but not the more specific relationship. For example, the father and the father's brother are identified with the same kinship term, mama.
