= Burrup Peninsula =

Burrup Peninsula in Western Australia

Coordinates: 20°36′S 116°48′E

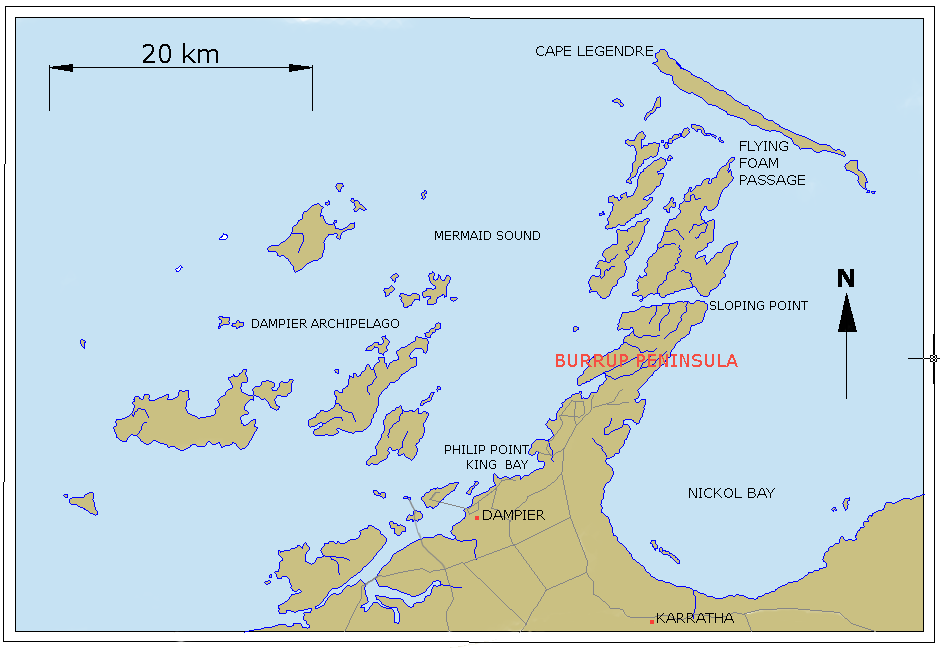
Dampier Archipelago and Burrup Peninsula

The Burrup Peninsula, previously known as Dampier Island, is a former island of the Dampier Archipelago that is now connected to the mainland via a causeway. The peninsula and islands together are also known as Murujuga. The peninsula is located in the Pilbara region of Western Australia and contains the town of Dampier as well as the Murujuga National Park. The peninsula includes the Murujuga Cultural Landscape, an area designated as a World Heritage Site in July 2025. The area contains the world's largest collection of ancient (approximately 40,000–50,000 years old) rock art (known as petroglyphs).

There is ongoing political debate on whether industrial development on the Burrup is resulting in the physical destruction and disturbance of petroglyphs. The government and industry agree that there is no ongoing damage via atmospheric pollution, while independent academics disagree.

The region is sometimes confused with the Dampier Peninsula, 800 kilometres (500 mi) to the north-east.

== History and toponymy ==
The traditional owners of Murujuga are an Aboriginal nation known as the Yaburara (Jaburara) people. In Ngayarda languages, including that of the Yaburara, murujuga means 'hip bone sticking out'. Between February and May 1869 a great number of Yaburara people were killed in an incident known as the Flying Foam Massacre. The five clans who took over the care of the land as traditional custodians following the massacre include Yaburara, Ngarluma, Mardudhunera, Yindjibarndi and Wong-Goo-Tt-Oo peoples.

First given the English name Dampier Island after the English navigator William Dampier (1651–1715), it was then an island lying 3 kilometres (1.9 mi) off the Pilbara coast. In 1963 the island became an artificial peninsula when it was connected to the mainland by a causeway for a road and railway. In 1979 Dampier Peninsula was renamed Burrup Peninsula after Mount Burrup, the highest peak on the island, which had been named after Henry Burrup, a Union Bank clerk murdered in 1885 at Roebourne.

== Murujuga Cultural Landscape ==
=== Description of rock art ===
Murujuga Cultural Landscape
UNESCO World Heritage Site
- Interactive map of Murujuga Cultural Landscape
- Criteria: i, iii, v
- Reference: 1709
- Inscription: 2025 (47th Session)
- Extensions: 99.881 ha

The Murujuga Cultural Landscape contains the world's largest and most important collection of petroglyphs. Some of the Aboriginal rock carvings have been dated to more than 45,000 years old, and some of the collection is generally estimated to be 40,000–50,000 years old. The collection of standing stones here is the largest in Australia with rock art petroglyphs numbering over one million, many depicting images of the now extinct thylacine (Tasmanian tiger). There are around a million engravings on the peninsula and islands, and around 2,500 archaeological sites which also include quarries, shell middens, and campsites.

The Dampier Rock Art Precinct covers the entire archipelago, while the Murujuga National Park lies within Burrup. The Dampier Rock Art Precinct was listed by the World Monuments Fund as one of the 100 Most Threatened Monuments in the world in 2003.

Most Murujuga rock art is on 2.7 billion year old igneous rocks. The rock art was made by etching away the outer millimetres of red-brown iron oxide, exposing pale centimetre-thick weathered clay. The underneath very hard igneous rock is dark grey-green coloured, and composed of granophyre, gabbo, dolerite, and granite.

The Murujuga cultural landscape was a well-known archaeological and cultural precinct during construction of industry across the area in the 1960s—1980s. However, it was not until 1998 that the first Indigenous Land Access Agreement was executed for industrial use of the Karratha Gas Plant area. This was a retrospective agreement, as the North West Shelf Gas Plant was constructed in the late 1970s and early 1980s, this ‘prior consent’ was not obtained for the North West Shelf project. The Ngarluma Yindjibarndi Foundation Ltd (NYFL) is the Traditional Owner agreement party for the 1998 Agreement. Later, the Burrup and Maitland Industrial Estates Agreement (BMIEA) was executed to allow for further industrial development across the Murujuga Cultural Landscape. Murujuga Aboriginal Corporation (MAC) represents Traditional Owners for the BMIEA area.

Examples of rock art at Murujuga
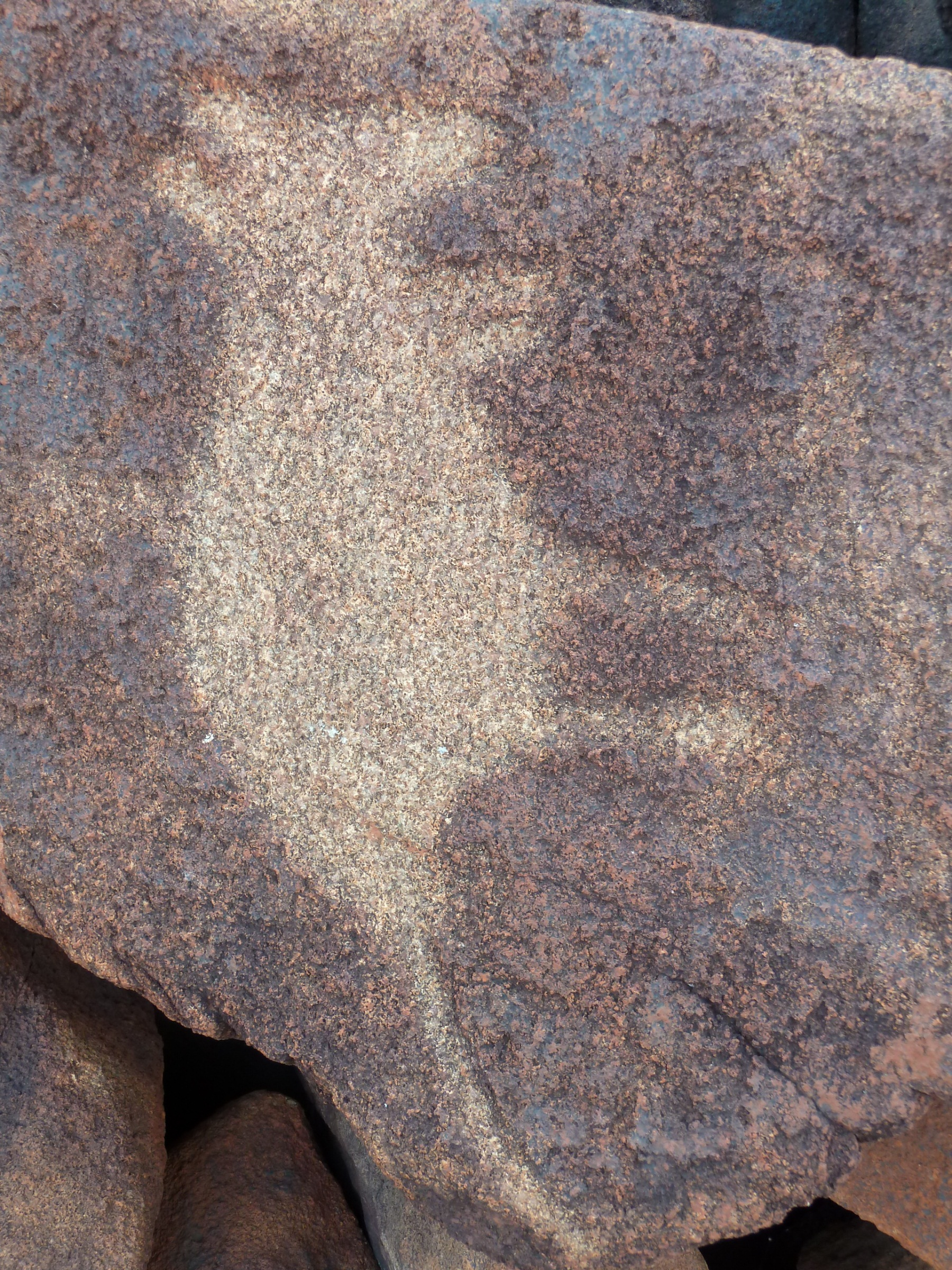

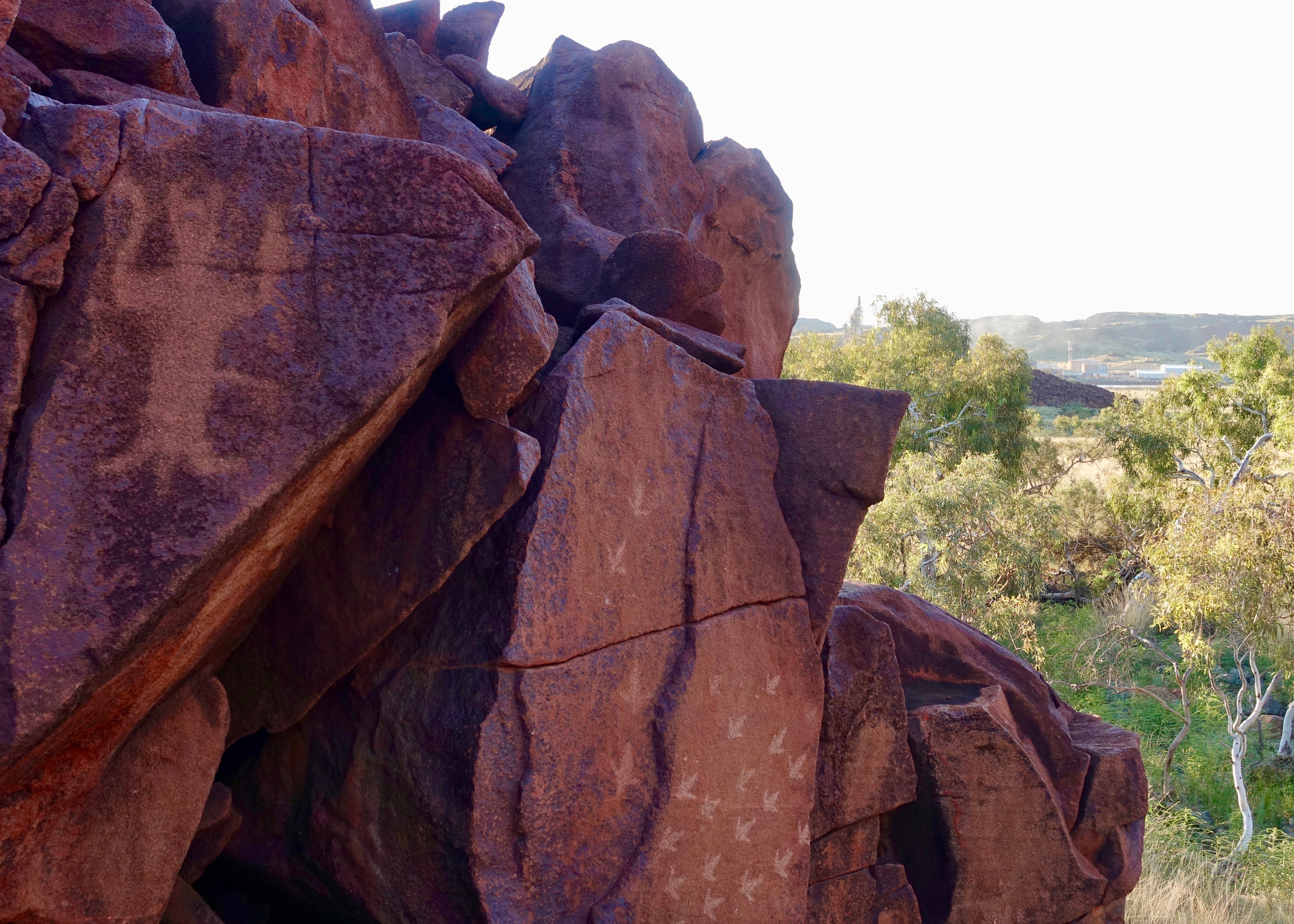

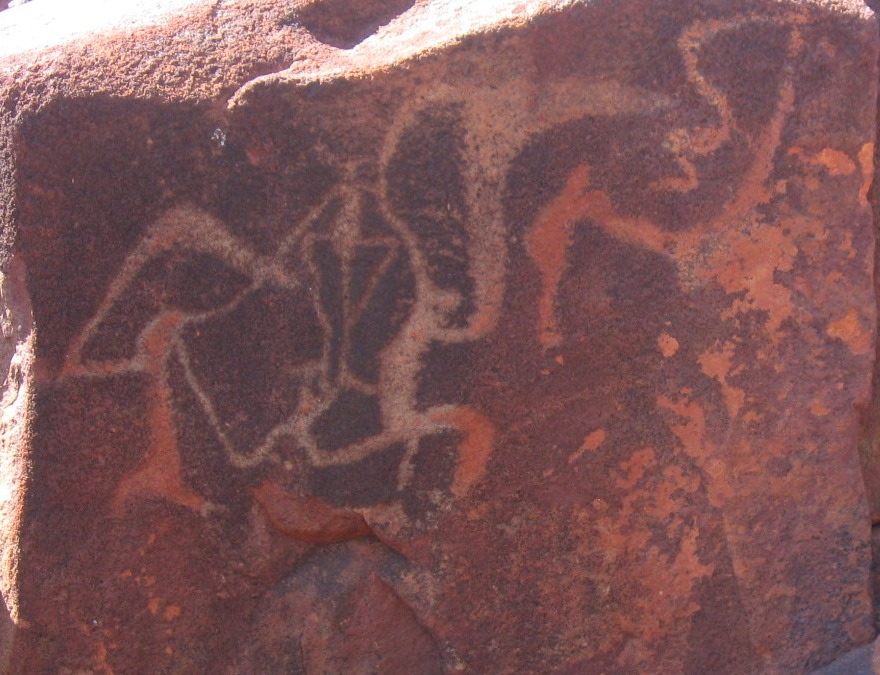

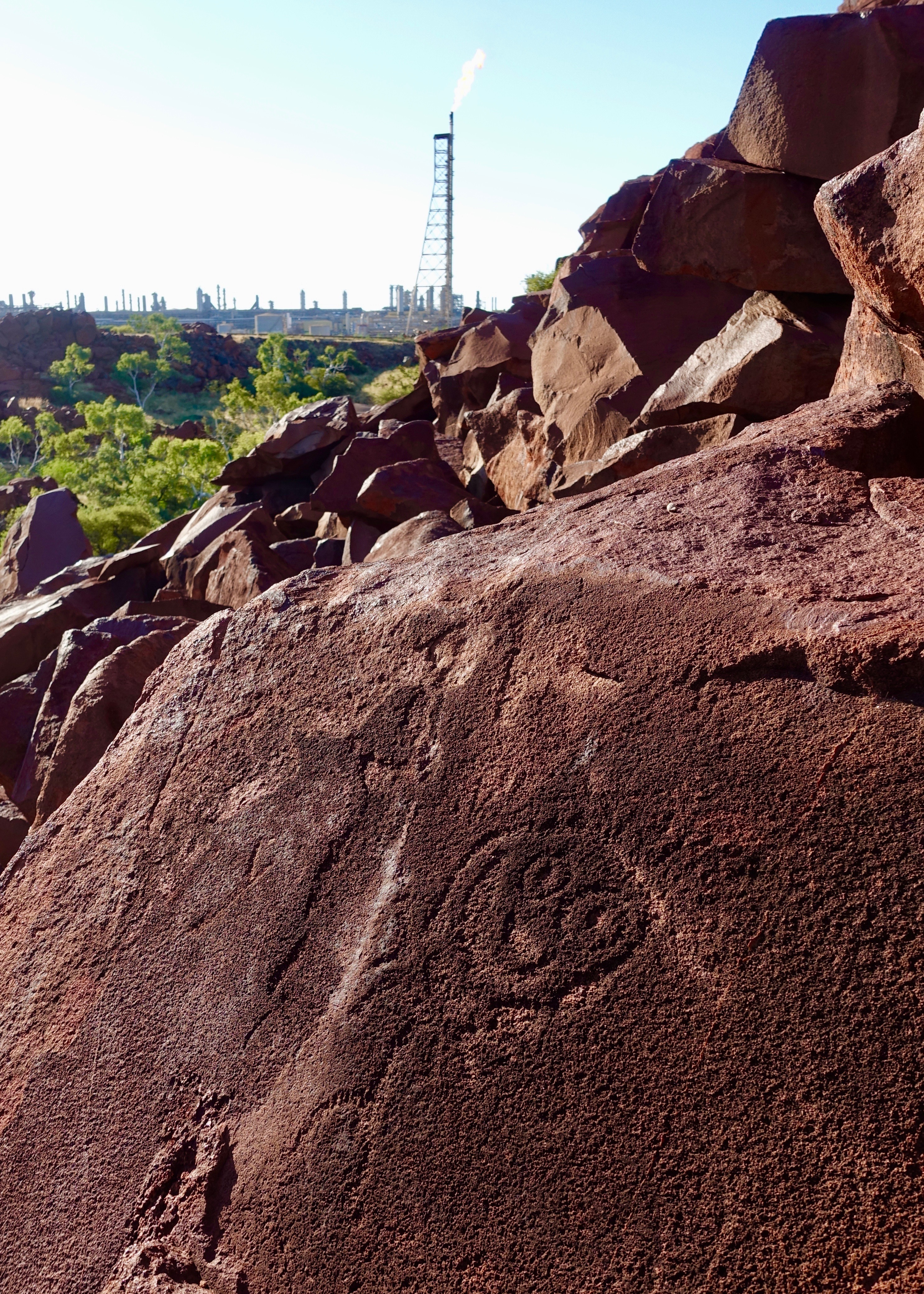

=== Road to World Heritage Listing ===
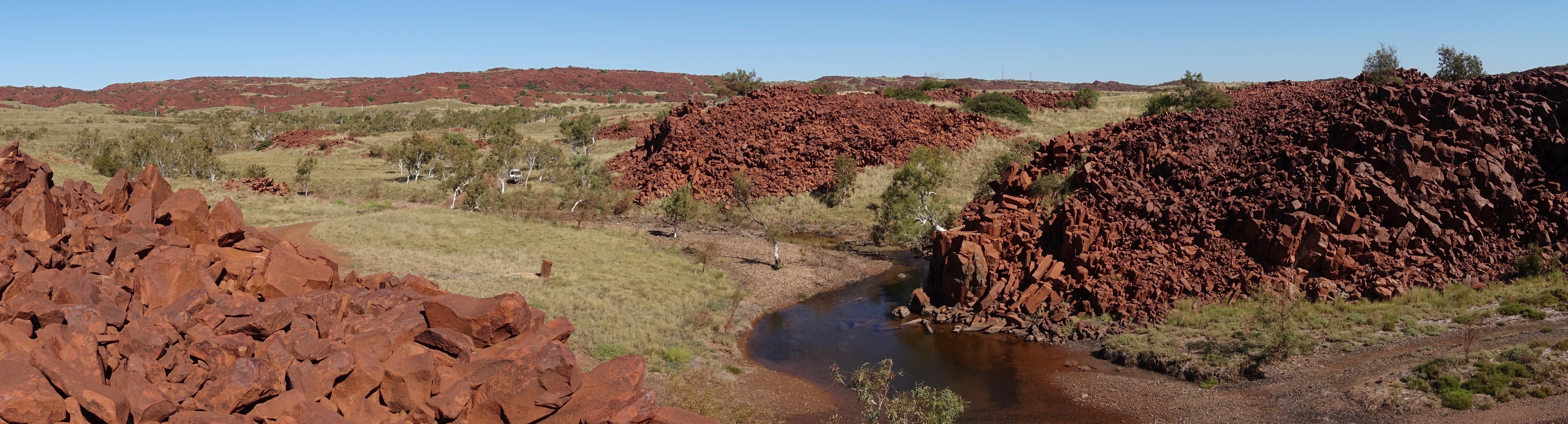
Murujuga

Concern around the ecological, historical, cultural and archaeological significance of the area has led to a campaign for its protection, causing conflict with industrial development on the site. The preservation of the Murujuga monument has been called for since 1969, and in 2002 the International Federation of Rock Art Organizations commenced a campaign to preserve the remaining monument. Murujuga has been listed in the National Trust of Australia Endangered Places Register and in the 2004, 2006, and 2008 World Monuments Watch by the World Monuments Fund.

About 900 sites, or 24.4 percent of the rock art on Burrup Peninsula, had been destroyed to make way for industrial development between 1963 and 2006. The Western Australian government argued for a much lower figure, suggesting that only 4 percent of sites, representing approximately 7.2 percent of petroglyphs, had been destroyed since 1972, citing the lack of a complete inventory of rock art in the region as making assessments is a challenging task.

1996 Burrup Peninsula Land Use Plan and Management Strategy map

In 1996, a land use plan by the Burrup Peninsula Management Advisory Board divided the region into two areas:

- a Conservation, Heritage and Recreation Area, spanning 5,400 hectares (13,000 acres), 62% of the Burrup
- an Industrial Area with an emphasis on port sites and strategic industry, 38% of the Burrup

While the plan commented upon "the value of the Northern Burrup for the preservation of its renowned Aboriginal heritage and environmental values", no comment was made on the amount of rock art affected by development and recreational activities.

Work commissioned by the National Trust of Western Australia led it to nominate the site for the National Trust Endangered Places list in 2002. In 2004, funding was provided by American Express through the World Monuments Fund for further research and advocacy to be undertaken, with the goal of achieving national heritage status for the site. In 2006 the Australian Heritage Council advised the federal Environment and Heritage Minister that the site was suitable for listing on the National Heritage List. The Western Australian state government continued to support development at the site, arguing a lack of cost-effective alternative sites and that geographical expansion of facility areas would be extremely limited. Former conservative party Resources Development Minister Colin Barnett temporarily supported campaigns to save rock art in this area. The federal government was divided on the issue. One reason to support site protection is that national heritage bodies support protection for the area, and the governments at national and state level had been of opposing political parties. On the other hand, the government was reluctant to interfere with the economic prosperity generated by the Western Australian economy. After scientific evidence showed that acidic emissions from nearby industry was harming the rock art irreparably in 2002, the government commissioned a four-year study of the impact of pollution, starting in 2004.

The protest campaign against development garnered popular support, which included 42,000 personal messages sent to Woodside Petroleum's directors at their May 2007 AGM. The directors said that the state government had directed them towards development among the rock art. The debate continued as of June 2007, with no intervention made by the Australian government. The federal minister indicated support for National Heritage listing, but the question of site boundaries and management strategies was still under negotiation. The site was heritage-listed in the Australian national heritage in 2007.

On 7 July 2008, the Australian Government placed 90% of the remaining rock art areas of the Dampier Archipelago on the National Heritage List. Campaigners continued to demand that the Australian Government include all of the undisturbed areas of the Dampier Archipelago on the World Heritage List. According to the Philip Adams radio show on Radio National, one worker on the site, an electrician for Woodside, claimed the company had crushed 10,000 petroglyphs for road fill, including the oldest representation of a human face. He said that the rock pools were filled with green scum and the eucalypts of the area were dying, and there was fluming of escaping natural gas from faulty piping.

In February 2009, the state government released a report finding that industry emissions did not damage the rock art. WA Greens Senator Rachel Siewart criticised Premier Colin Barnett for reversing his previous support for protecting the rock art. However, a 2011 report by researcher Mike Donaldson wrote that reducing emissions was essential to protect the rock art for future generations. Along with mechanical damage to the rock art from industrial land clearance for roads, pipelines, power lines, and other areas, Murujuga rock art has been damaged by industrial pollution. Acidic dust pollution combines with water to form acids that dissolute manganese and iron compounds, causing the fragmentation of the rock varnish and patina.

As of 2011, the area remained on the World Monument Fund's list of 100 Most Endangered Places in the World - the only such site in Australia - because of continued mismanagement of the heritage and conservation values of the Burrup.

In January 2020, the Australian Government lodged a submission for the Murujuga Cultural Landscape to be included as an Australian entry to the World Heritage Tentative List.

In November 2021, around 50 local people rallied at Karratha to protest against one of the biggest oil and gas developments ever undertaken in Australia, by Woodside Petroleum and BHP, known as the Scarborough project (Scarborough being the name of the gas field, 375 km (233 mi) off the Pilbara coast). The project includes a floating production unit, the drilling of 13 wells, and a 430 km (270 mi) pipeline to transport the gas to the onshore Pluto LNG processing facility near Karratha, which will be expanded. Production is expected to begin in 2026. The project received environmental approval. The Murujuga Aboriginal Corporation has no role in approving such industrial projects, but there has been research being undertaken as to whether increased emissions would affect the rock art.

In July 2022, Raelene Cooper presented the concerns of some of the traditional owners to the UN in Geneva, which stated "The rock art archives our lore. It is written not on a tablet of stone, but carved into the ngurra, which holds our Dreaming stories and Songlines". She also wrote to government ministers Linda Burney and Tanya Plibersek.

==== World Heritage listing and scientific controversy ====
In 2023 the Murujuga Rock Art Monitoring Program commenced the most extensive scientific study to examine the impact of industrial air emissions on the rock art engravings of Murujuga over a five year period. The program is led by the Murujuga Aboriginal Corporation, West Australia's Department of Water and Environmental Regulation and Curtin University.

The program's Year Two report was given to the government in June 2024 and was slated for release at the end of 2024, but it was released to the public on 23 May 2025. This was days before Minister for the Environment and Water, Murray Watt, gave preliminary approval to Woodside to keep running their North West Shelf assets, including those on the Burrup, until the 2070s. The report found no evidence of acid rain, air quality "good" to "very good", nitrogen dioxide levels five times lower than international standard and 16 times lower than the national standard and sulphur dioxide never exceeding 10% of the national standard.

The executive summary suggests that historic emissions from the former Dampier Power Station had previously degraded some of the areas close to Dampier. However, world-renowned rock art specialist Professor Ben Smith claims that the government lied in the executive summary and had twisted the findings of the full 800 page report. Describing the executive summary, he said:

"This document is not worth the paper that it is written on. It's a disgrace, a disgrace to Australian science and my colleagues at Curtin... We want to see the science used properly by this government to protect the cultural heritage of Murujuga. We do not want to get a pack of lies and a bunch of bullshit that we see in this executive summary... The minister cannot make a decision on the expansion of North West shelf on the basis of this propaganda document."

— Archaeology Professor Ben Smith, 2025

Emeritus Professor Adrian Baddeley, who was the report's chief statistician, said one of those graphs had been altered on the summary. The alteration removed a line in the main report that marked an early warning threshold of pollution. He said that the Department of Water and Environmental Regulation had "prevailed" and had the line removed, he said "this constitutes unacceptable interference in the scientific integrity of the project."

The program was instrumental in the site achieving World Heritage listing.

==== World Heritage listing ====
In July 2025, the site was designated as a World Heritage Site at the 47th session of the World Heritage Committee in Paris, where all member states of UNESCO voted in favour of the resolution. An area of 99.881 ha (246.81 acres) is covered by the designation, which was made under the following criteria:

- (i) to represent a masterpiece of human creative genius
- (iii) to bear a unique or at least exceptional testimony to a cultural tradition or to a civilization which is living or which has disappeared
- (v) to be an outstanding example of a traditional human settlement, land-use, or sea-use which is representative of a culture (or cultures), or human interaction with the environment especially when it has become vulnerable under the impact of irreversible change

The site is the 21st world heritage site declared in Australia, and the second one recognised for its Aboriginal cultural values, the other being the Budj Bim heritage areas in Victoria (inscribed 2019). The listing was cited by West Australian Premier Roger Cook of proof that industry and protected cultural sites can co-exist.

=== Visiting ===
After the Murujuga National Park was closed for some months to allow for its construction, the Ngajarli Trail was completed in August 2020. Traditional owners working in collaboration with the government created a 700-metre (2,300 ft) universal boardwalk, along with interpretative signs. The Murujuga Aboriginal Corporation hopes to improve and enlarge facilities for visitors and to help them appreciate the cultural significance of the site.

== Undersea archaeological site ==
On 1 July 2020, scientists published a study reporting on the finding of Australia's first ancient Aboriginal underwater archaeological sites at two locations off the Burrup Peninsula. The 269 artefacts found at Cape Bruguieres, as well as an 8,500-year-old underwater freshwater spring at Flying Foam Passage off Dampier are described in the study. Estimated to be thousands of years old, the artefacts include hundreds of stone tools and grinding stones, evidence of life before sea levels rose between 7,000 and 18,000 years ago, after the last ice age. The Australian Archaeological Association described the research as "highly significant".

The report was the result of four years of work by a team of archaeologists, rock art specialists, geomorphologists, geologists, specialist pilots and scientific divers, funded by the Australian Research Council, in collaboration with the Murujuga Aboriginal Corporation, on a project known as the "Deep History of Sea Country" project. Teams from Flinders University, the University of Western Australia, James Cook University, Airborne Research Australia, and the University of York in England were involved.

The site was placed on the WA Aboriginal Heritage List (protected under the Aboriginal Heritage Act 1972), and the Federal Government said such underwater sites fall under the state jurisdiction. The federal Underwater Cultural Heritage Act 2018 was updated in 2019 to automatically include sunken aircraft and shipwrecks older than 75 years, but it does not automatically include Aboriginal sites.

== See also ==
- Visual arts of Australia
- Prehistory of Australia
