= Mardudunera people =

Aboriginal people of Pilbara, Western Australia

The Mardudunera, more accurately, Martuthunira, are an Aboriginal Australian people in the Pilbara region of Western Australia.

== Name ==
The ethnonym "Martuthunira" reflects the word Martuthuni used to denote the lower reaches of the Fortescue River. The ra is a suffix indicating place of origin or provenience. Various theories have been advanced to analyse the word in terms of a root martu - not available in the Martuthunira language itself - and the suffix -thuni, the latter recurring in a few toponyms. In Yindjibarndi martu means 'place, space, spot'. Carl Georg von Brandenstein proposed an etymology which would make the word mean 'flat-' or 'river-landers'.

== Language ==
An extensive knowledge of the Martuthunira language exists. A several hundred page outline was written by Alan Dench, a student of Peter Austin's, after one of the three remaining speakers, Algy Paterson, approached him asking Dench to preserve the language his own maternal grandmother had once spoken.

== Country ==
Alfred Radcliffe-Brown in 1913 gave an estimation that implied that the Mardudunera's traditional lands extended over 3,500 square miles (9,100 km^{2}). For Norman Tindale, they covered somewhat less, and his estimate was that the tribal area covering roughly 2,100 square miles (5,400 km^{2}) in the Pilbara, stretching over the land from the inland ranges to the coastal plain, north of Fortescue River. They included a number of islands they would visit in the Dampier Archipelago. Recently Alan Dench, an authority on the people, has endorsed Radcliffe-Brown's original determination. Their north-eastern boundary is marked by three hills, Mount Leopold, Moondle Hill and Mount McLeod, while Warluru Pool, marks their eastern limits. Dench adds that Tindale is incorrect in his island claims, for archaeology has failed to turn up pre-contact traces of their presence on Barrow Island, and modern Mardudunera do not believe it formed part of their world.

== History of contact with whites ==
It is believed that the first contact with white people occurred on 26 February 1818 during the explorer Phillip Parker King's first voyage in HMS Mermaid, which took him to the north-western coast of Australia. King describes the scene:

As we advanced, three natives were seen in the water, apparently wading from an island in the centre of the strait towards Lewis Island: the course was immediately altered to intercept them, but as we approached, it was discovered that each native was seated on a log of wood, which he propelled through the water by paddling with his hands. Having hove to, close by them, they became much alarmed, and cried out in loud tones, which were increased when our boat was lowered and despatched after them; but it was not without the greatest difficulty that Mr. Bedwell succeeded in bringing one on board. On the boat's coming up with the nearest Indian, he left his log and, diving under the boat's bottom, swam astern; this he did whenever the boat approached him, and it was four or five minutes before he was caught, which was at last effected by seizing him by the hair, in the act of diving, and dragging him into the boat, against which he resisted stoutly, and, even when taken, it required two men to hold him to prevent his escape. During the interval of heaving to and bringing him on board, the cutter was anchored near the central island, where a tribe of natives were collected, consisting of about forty persons, of whom the greater number were women and children; the whole party appeared to be overcome with grief, particularly the women, who most loudly and vehemently expressed their sorrow by cries, and rolling on the ground, and covering their bodies with the sand.

Once on board, the captive, a six foot tall lad in his early twenties, scarified with horizontal strips from his chest to his navel, but with no nose-piercing or tooth evulsion, was treated to sugared water, and, turning to the shore, cried out: coma negra!. He was allowed to return to his camp on his log – called a "marine velocipede", whose construction from mangrove roots was described in detail – with various gifts, such as a red cap, biscuits and an axe. On beaching, he was interrogated by his terrified companions, who held him at spear point, and then physically examined. A further bundle of gifts was delivered towards dusk.

== Alternative names ==
- Mardudjungara
- Mardudhunera, Mardudhunira, Mardudhoonera
- Mardutunira Mardatunera
- Marduduna
- Mardathoni
- Mardatuna
- Maratunia
- Jawunmala (the Indjibandi exonym)

== Sources ==
- "AIATSIS map of Indigenous Australia". AIATSIS. 14 May 2024.
- "Tindale Tribal Boundaries" (PDF). Department of Aboriginal Affairs, Western Australia. September 2016. Archived from the original (PDF) on 8 March 2016.
- Brown, A. R. (January–June 1913). "Three Tribes of Western Australia". The Journal of the Royal Anthropological Institute of Great Britain and Ireland. 43: 143–194. doi:10.2307/2843166. JSTOR 2843166.
- Clement, Emile (1903). "Ethnographical notes on the Western Australian aborigines" (PDF). Internationales Archiv für Ethnographie. 16. Leiden: 1–29.
- Dench, Alan Charles (1995). Martuthunira: A Language of the Pilbara Region of Western Australia (PDF). ANU Department of Linguistics, Research School of Pacific and Asian Studies. ISBN 978-0-858-83422-4.
- King, Phillip Parker (1827). Narrative of a survey of the intertropical and western coasts of Australia performed between the years 1818 and 1822 (PDF). Vol. 1. London: John Murray.
- Tindale, Norman Barnett (1974). "Mardudunera (WA)". Aboriginal Tribes of Australia: Their Terrain, Environmental Controls, Distribution, Limits, and Proper Names. Australian National University. ISBN 978-0-708-10741-6. Archived from the original on 20 March 2020.
