= Yule River =

River in the Pilbara region of Western Australia

Coordinates: 20°24′16″S 118°11′39″E

Location
- Country: Australia

Physical characteristics
- Source
  - location: Chichester Range
  - elevation: 451 m (1,480 ft)
- Mouth
  - location: Indian Ocean
  - elevation: sea level
- Length: 190 km (118 mi)
- Basin size: 8,430 km^{2} (3,255 sq mi)
- Discharge
  - average: 223 GL/a (7.1 m^{3}/s; 250 cu ft/s)

The Yule River is an ephemeral river in the Pilbara region of Western Australia. It was named on 10 August 1861 by the surveyor and explorer Frank Gregory while on expedition in the area, after Thomas Newte Yule, at times farmer of Toodyay, winemaker, Acting Colonial Secretary and Magistrate.

== Flow ==
The headwaters of the river rise in the Abydos Plain between the Chichester Range and the Mungaroona Range in the Scientific Reserve then flow in a north-westerly direction crossing the North West Coastal Highway approximately 60 kilometres (37 mi) south of Port Hedland then discharging into the Indian Ocean near Cape Thouin. The river becomes more braided as it flows northward producing a wide alluvial riverbed; in the latter part of the journey the river bifurcates into the Yule and the Yule River West branches. The river forms a large estuary at the river mouth with an area of 31.4 square kilometres (12 sq mi).

The river has ten tributaries, including Cockerega River, West Yule River, Pilbara Creek, Friendly Creek and Coorong Creek.

The river flows through a number of permanent pools, including Kangan Pool and Moolkamudda Pool.

During drought conditions the river has recorded zero flow for two years duration. The river also occasionally floods, particularly in 1975 when Cyclone Joan inundated the catchment area. The flood flow discharge was estimated at 22,000 cubic metres per second (780,000 cu ft/s) at the river's peak.

The river's water quality varies depending on the flow, but the average turbidity of the river water is 187 NTU and the average salinity is 105 milligrams per litre (3.8×10^{−6} lb/cu in).

The traditional owners of the area are the Indjibandi, Njamal or Nyamal peoples.

Prehistoric petroglyphs were found along rock-faces in the upper Yule River in the 1950s.

== Borefield ==
The Yule River Borefield has been in operation as one of the sources supplying the town of Port Hedland with drinking water.
