= Ngarla =

Aboriginal Australian people of Western Australia

The Ngarla are an Aboriginal Australian people of the Pilbara region of Western Australia.

== Country ==
Norman Tindale estimated their territory, to the west of Port Hedland, at around 2,000 square miles (5,200 km^{2}), describing it as lying along the coast to the west of Solitary Island as far as the mouth of the De Grey River. (Note: "The Ngurla tribe occupy about twenty miles frontage to the De Grey River on each side of its mouth, and their territory extends back for the same distance on both sides.") He set their upriver boundary between Kudingaranga (Mulyie Station) and Tjaljaranja (otherwise known as Taluirina Pool). Their traditional inland extension was said to run up to Yarrie.

== Social organisation ==
The Ngarla had a four class system:

- Poorungnoo marries a Parrijari producing Kiamoona.
- Banakoo marries a Kiamoona, giving birth to Parrijari.
- Parrijari marries Poorungnoo, producing Banakoo.
- Kiamoona marries Banakoo, producing Poorungnoo.

== History of contact ==
White colonisation of Ngarla domains began in 1864. Over the following two years, smallpox swept through the area killing off large numbers of Ngarla. By 1886 there were said to be several hundred.

== Alternative names ==
- Nga:la
- Ngala, Ngerla
- Ngurla, Ngirla
- Ngala
- Gnalla
- Ngalana
- Kudjunguru (a Nyamal exonym meaning "coast dwellers")

== Some words ==
- yookaroo (wild dog)
- mala, maltha (father)
- wanire, wirnea (mother)
- nurloo (white man)

== Sources ==
- "AIATSIS map of Indigenous Australia". AIATSIS. 14 May 2024.
- "Tindale Tribal Boundaries" (PDF). Department of Aboriginal Affairs, Western Australia. September 2016. Archived from the original (PDF) on 8 March 2016.
- Harper, Charles (1886). "The Mouth of the De Grey River:The Ngurla tribe" (PDF). In Curr, Edward Micklethwaite (ed.). The Australian race: its origin, languages, customs, place of landing in Australia and the routes by which it spread itself over the continent. Vol. 1. Melbourne: J. Ferres. pp. 287–293.
- Tindale, Norman Barnett (1974). "Ngarla (WA)". Aboriginal Tribes of Australia: Their Terrain, Environmental Controls, Distribution, Limits, and Proper Names. Australian National University. ISBN 978-0-708-10741-6. Archived from the original on 20 March 2020.
- Tonkinson, Robert (1989). "Local Organisation and Land Tenure in the Karlamilyi (Rudall River) Region" (PDF). In Western Desert Working Group (ed.). The significance of the Karlamilyi Region to the Martujarra people of the Western Desert. Perth: Department of Conservation and Land Management. pp. 99–259.
