= Dampier Archipelago =

Archipelago of Western Australia

Location of the Dampier Archipelago in the Indian Ocean

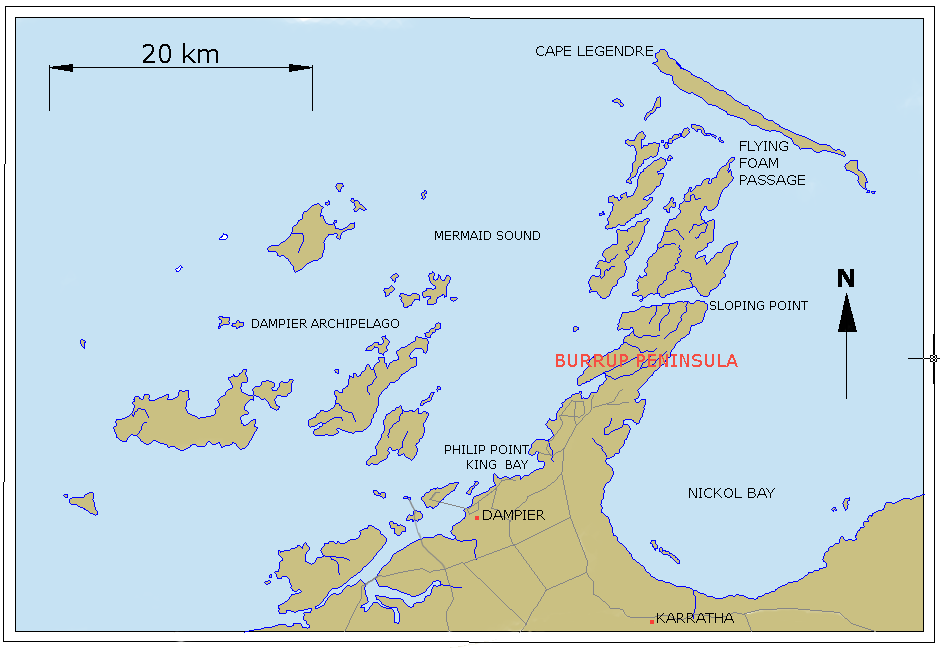
Map of Dampier Archipelago and Burrup Peninsula

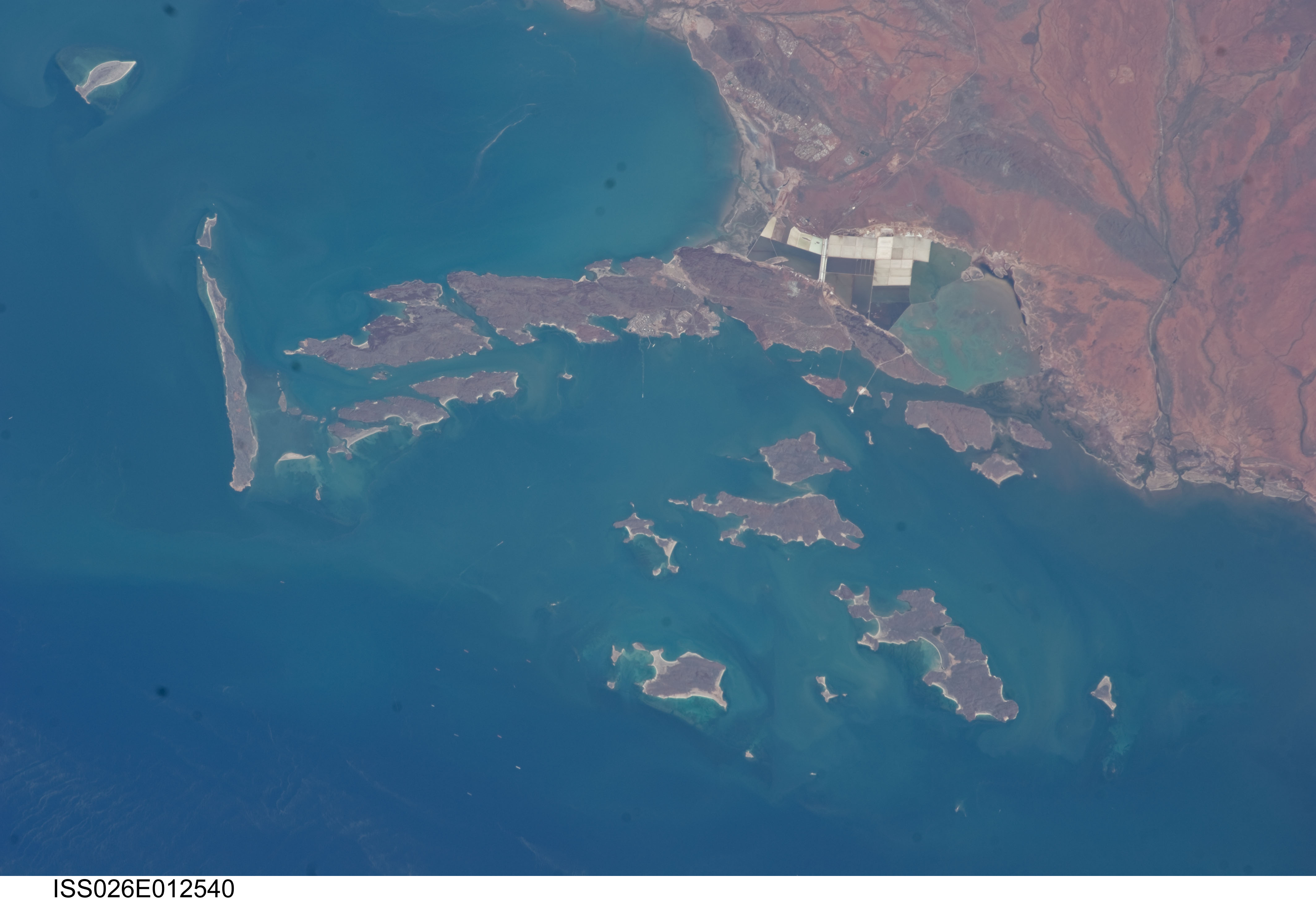
Satellite image of the Dampier Archipelago on 24 December 2010.

The Dampier Archipelago is a group of 42 islands near the town of Dampier in Pilbara, Western Australia.

The archipelago is also made up of reefs, shoals, channels and straits and is the traditional home of five Aboriginal language groups. It was formed 7000 years ago when rising sea levels flooded what were once coastal plains. The underlying rocks are among the oldest on Earth, formed in the Archaean period more than 2.4 billion years ago.

It is named after William Dampier, an English buccaneer and explorer who visited in 1699. Dampier named one of the islands Rosemary Island.

Despite being a region through which considerable shipping and industrial activity occurs, the archipelago has considerable marine resources.

== History ==
Dampier Archipelago is the site of some of Australia's oldest domestic structures, estimated to be between 8000 and 9000 years old.

The largest island (or peninsula) in the group was known as Murujuga by the Yaburara people. The first British settlers renamed it Dampier Island and it was later officially renamed Burrup Peninsula.

A whaling station was in operation at Whalers Bay on Malus Island in the archipelago during the 1870s.

== Climate ==
The archipelago has a tropical desert climate (Köppen: BWh); with a highly erratic rainfall due to receiving precipitation from irregular tropical cyclones. Climate data was sourced from Legendre Island, the northernmost island. Extreme temperatures have ranged from 44.5 °C (112.1 °F) on 21 February 2015 to 13.6 °C (56.5 °F) on 7 July 2012.

Climate data for Legendre Island (20.36°S 116.84°E) (29 m (95 ft) AMSL) (2005–2025)
Month	Jan	Feb	Mar	Apr	May	Jun	Jul	Aug	Sep	Oct	Nov	Dec	Year
Record high °C (°F)	43.9 (111.0)	44.5 (112.1)	40.5 (104.9)	39.0 (102.2)	35.0 (95.0)	30.3 (86.5)	31.0 (87.8)	33.0 (91.4)	36.2 (97.2)	40.3 (104.5)	43.0 (109.4)	41.5 (106.7)	44.5 (112.1)
Mean daily maximum °C (°F)	33.0 (91.4)	33.6 (92.5)	33.9 (93.0)	32.5 (90.5)	28.4 (83.1)	25.4 (77.7)	24.9 (76.8)	26.3 (79.3)	28.4 (83.1)	30.8 (87.4)	31.6 (88.9)	32.6 (90.7)	30.1 (86.2)
Mean daily minimum °C (°F)	26.9 (80.4)	27.2 (81.0)	27.3 (81.1)	25.8 (78.4)	22.2 (72.0)	19.6 (67.3)	18.2 (64.8)	19.0 (66.2)	20.7 (69.3)	23.1 (73.6)	24.6 (76.3)	26.2 (79.2)	23.4 (74.1)
Record low °C (°F)	22.8 (73.0)	21.4 (70.5)	20.3 (68.5)	16.9 (62.4)	15.7 (60.3)	13.9 (57.0)	13.6 (56.5)	14.3 (57.7)	15.7 (60.3)	16.9 (62.4)	20.1 (68.2)	20.8 (69.4)	13.6 (56.5)
Source: Bureau of Meteorology (2009–2025)

== Indigenous heritage ==
The Yinidbarndi, Yaburara, Mardudhunera, and Woon-goo-tt-oo peoples have lived in the area for approximately 50,000 years. In 1868, the area was the site of the Flying Foam massacre, in which between 20 and 150 members of the Yaburara are reported to have been killed.

== Sources ==
- Chittleborough, R. G. (1983). "The Dampier Archipelago marine study : a progress report". Bulletin (141). Perth, Western Australia: Department of Conservation and Environment.
