= Carl Georg von Brandenstein =

German linguist

- Born: 10 October 1909; Hanover
- Died: 8 January 2005; Albany
- Resting place: Albany
- Spouses: Ellen Spuhrmann (m. 1939; div. 1954); Carola Johanna Elisabeth Zanke (m. 1962; died 1991)
- Children: Bettina
- Parents: Karl Eduard Emil Franz von Brandenstein (15 September 1875 – 23 July 1946) (father); Erika Hedwig Karoline Jacobi von Wangelin (4 September 1885 – 16 September 1969) (mother)

Carl-Georg Christoph Freiherr von Brandenstein (10 October 1909 – 8 January 2005) was a German linguist who took up the study of Australian Aboriginal languages.

== Life ==
Born in 1909 in Hannover to Carl von Brandenstein, Carl-Georg finished high school in Weimar, and studied oriental languages and the history of religion at Berlin University (1928–1934), and Leipzig (1938–1939). His doctoral thesis was a dissertation on the iconography of Hittite gods.

He did war service in France and Russia. In 1941 the Canaris spy network dispatched him on an intelligence mission to Persia, where he was picked up by the British. He spent the next four years of the war as a prisoner of war in Australia, in Loveday in South Australia and at Tatura in Victoria.

== Australian work on Aboriginal languages ==
Brandenstein's field work lasted some three decades, beginning in the 1960s. He initially concentrated on the languages of Aboriginal groups in the Pilbara area of Western Australia, and then gathered recordings and made analyses of southern tribal languages such as Ngadjumaya and Noongar. His major contribution consisted in challenging the use of the term and concept of totem adopted throughout anthropology from an original Ojibwa word, and widely used in kinship analysis. For Brandenstein, an etymological approach indicated that the majority of 'totemic' terms could be traced back to the vocabulary for human and animal bodies, and temperamental qualities. In short, identity was not reducible to belonging to one or another segmentary division of a tribe, but involved far more concrete traits. Throughout the Australian totemic system he believed he could isolate a logic, which in its fullest form, evinced 8 combinations of three paired terms of primary properties. Two totems in a binary tribal moiety could be shown to each involve a set of up to 20 features that could be distributed as traits over all human and non-human members of each of the two groups.

== Criticism ==
One of his most startling ideas was his claim that he had isolated and identified some sixty Portuguese language loanwords in several indigenous languages of Australia's far north. Australian linguists have generally dismissed these conclusions, except perhaps for the word tartaruga. Nick Thieberger, a Melbourne University linguist, argues that Brandenstein's approach was still strongly influenced by outdated nineteenth-century linguistic thinking.

== See also ==
- Theory of the Portuguese discovery of Australia

== Works ==
- (with A. F. Thomas) Taruru: Aboriginal song poetry from the Pilbara. 1969
- (editor) Narratives from the north-west of Western Australia in the Ngarluma and Jindjiparndi languages / narrated by R. Churnside.
- The Phoenix Totemism 1972
- Names and substance of the Australian subsection system. University of Chicago Press.ISBN 978-0-226-86481-5
- Nyungar Anew: phonology, text samples and etymological and historical 1500-word vocabulary of an artificially recreated Aboriginal language in the south-west of Australia. 1988
- (with Arthur Capell, Kenneth L. Hale) Papers in Australian linguistics.
- Early history of Australia:the Portuguese colony in the Kimberley. 1994
- A partial vocabulary of the Ngalooma Aboriginal tribe by H.A. Hall, with concordance and commentary by C.G. von Brandenstein.
