= Georgian conjugation =

For non-native speakers, verb conjugation in Georgian presents a number of challenges since verbs in Georgian present numerous idiosyncracies and wide irregularities.

This article presupposes familiarity with Georgian grammar. In short, important factors to keep track of are the following:

1. Georgian has four classes of verbs: transitive, intransitive, medial and indirect verbs. Each class has its own set of rules of conjugation for all screeves (counterpart of tense-aspect-moods). However, numerous verbs in Georgian do not conform to the conjugation of a single class (see irregular verbs below).
2. Preverb. Although preverbs may have directional meanings, it is often diachronic patterns that indicate which verb takes which preverb. In addition, many verbs in Georgian can have a common verb stem. Since preverbs are absent in the present screeves, these verbs are identical in the present series, and differ in the rest of the series, because different preverbs are prefixed to the verb stem.
3. Versions. The versioners in Georgian establish the language's polypersonalism. Although each version vowel has a specific meaning, most of the time, like preverbs, they have arbitrary meanings. Therefore, when learning a new verb, the version vowel the verb employs should also be learnt.
4. Thematic suffix. Thematic suffixes are the stems that follow the root of the verb. They are used in the present and future screeves and are mostly (though not always) absent in the aorist and perfective screeves. Like preverbs and versions, thematic suffixes are not only arbitrary, but they also determine the conjugation in the aorist and perfective screeves for transitive (class 1) verbs. There are nine thematic suffixes in Georgian, and almost all the verbs have a specific thematic suffix. Again, when learning a new verb, the thematic suffix has to be learnt together with the other elements.
5. In addition, one also has to take into account which suffixal nominal marker is to be used for each verb. This is, however, not arbitrary. The use of appropriate suffixal nominal marker depends on the thematic suffix (as stated above). For each thematic suffix, there are rules for whether the conjugation is strong or weak for the aorist series and the perfective series of screeves. These rules for each thematic suffix have to be mastered.
6. Unusual for an agglutinative language, Georgian has many irregular verbs. It is not possible to give an exact number, because there are different levels of irregularities. Some verbs have different verb roots in different screeves and, thus, are considered irregular. Some other verbs use the same verb root throughout all the screeves, but their conjugations deviate from the normal paradigm of the verb class that they belong to. In addition, some indirect verbs (class 4) are also considered irregular, because they only behave like indirect verbs in the present screeves, and behave like transitive verbs (class 1) in the rest of the screeves.

== Class 1 (transitive verbs) ==
- In the present and future sub-series, the subject is in the nominative case and both the direct and indirect objects are in the dative case. The subject is indicated by the v- set marker, while the object is indicated by the m- set marker.
- In the aorist series, the subject is in the ergative case while the direct object is in the nominative case. Indirect object is in the dative case. The subject is indicated by the v- set marker, while the object is indicated by the m- set marker.
- In the perfective series, the subject is in the dative case while the direct object is in the nominative case. Indirect object is usually indicated with the postposition -tvis (for). The subject is indicated by the m- set marker, while the object is indicated by the v- set marker.
- In the present sub-series, the preverbs are absent, but the thematic suffixes are present.
- In the future sub-series, the preverbs emerge, and the thematic suffixes remain.
- In the aorist series, the preverbs emerge, and the thematic suffixes are absent (mostly).
- In the perfective series, the preverbs emerge, and, if the thematic suffix is -eb, its presence depends on whether or not there is a vowel in the root of the verb. If there is a vowel, the thematic suffix remains, otherwise it is lost.

Here is a full conjugation of a verb with all persons in all screeves:

Verb root

შენ, šen; infinite form აშენება, ašeneba (to build)

Present subseries

The thematic suffix -eb is present, but without the preverb:

	Present indicative	Imperfect ¹	Present subjunctive ²
1s	ვაშენებ v-a-šen-eb	ვაშენებდი, v-a-šen-eb-d-i	ვაშენებდე v-a-šen-eb-de
2s	აშენებ a-šen-eb	აშენებდი, a-šen-eb-d-i	აშენებდე a-šen-eb-de
3s	აშენებს a-šen-eb-s	აშენებდა a-šen-eb-d-a	აშენებდეს a-šen-eb-des
1p	ვაშენებთ v-a-šen-eb-t	ვაშენებდით v-a-šen-eb-d-i-t	ვაშენებდეთ v-a-šen-eb-det
2p	აშენებთ a-šen-eb-t	აშენებდით a-šen-eb-d-i-t	აშენებდეთ a-šen-eb-det
3p	აშენებენ a-šen-eb-en	აშენებდნენ a-šen-eb-d-nen	აშენებდნენ a-šen-eb-d-nen

Future subseries

The preverb a- emerges:

	Future indicative	Conditional	Future subjunctive
1s	ავაშენებ, a-v-a-šen-eb	ავაშენებდი, a-v-a-šen-eb-d-i	ავაშენებდე, a-v-a-šen-eb-de
2s	ააშენებ, a-a-šen-eb	ააშენებდი, a-a-šen-eb-d-i	ააშენებდე, a-a-šen-eb-de
3s	ააშენებს, a-a-šen-eb-s	ააშენებდა, a-a-šen-eb-d-a	ააშენებდეს, a-a-šen-eb-des
1p	ავაშენებთ, a-v-a-šen-ebt	ავაშენებდით, a-v-a-šen-eb-d-it	ავაშენებდეთ, a-v-a-šen-eb-d-et
2p	ააშენებთ, a-a-šen-ebt	ააშენებდით, a-a-šen-eb-d-it	ააშენებდეთ, a-a-šen-eb-d-et
3p	ააშენებენ, a-a-šen-eb-en	ააშენებდნენ, a-a-šen-eb-d-nen	ააშენებდნენ, a-a-šen-eb-d-nen

Aorist series

The preverb is present; the thematic suffix is lost:

	Aorist indicative ³	Optative
1s	ავაშენე, a-v-a-šene	ავაშენო, a-v-a-šen-o
2s	ააშენე, a-a-šene	ააშენო, a-a-šen-o
3s	ააშენა, a-a-šen-a	ააშენოს, a-a-šen-o-s
1p	ავაშენეთ, a-v-a-šenet	ავაშენოთ, a-v-a-šen-o-t
2p	ააშენეთ, a-a-šenet	ააშენოთ, a-a-šen-o-t
3p	ააშენეს, a-a-šenes	ააშენონ, a-a-šen-o-n

Perfective series

The preverb is present; the thematic suffix is present (due to vowel in root). N.B. subject is marked with the m- set, and the verb form here assumes a 3rd person singular direct object:

	Perfect †	Pluperfect ‡	Perfect subjunctive
1s	ამიშენებია, a-m-i-šen-eb-i-a	ამეშენებინა, a-m-e-šen-eb-in-a	ამეშენებინოს, a-m-e-šen-eb-in-o-s
2s	აგიშენებია, a-g-i-šen-eb-i-a	აგეშენებინა, a-g-e-šen-eb-in-a	აგეშენებინოს, a-g-e-šen-eb-in-o-s
3s	აუშენებია, a-u-šen-eb-i-a	აეშენებინა, a-e-šen-eb-in-a	აეშენებინოს, a-e-šen-eb-in-o-s
1p	აგვიშენებია, a-gv-i-šen-eb-i-a	აგვეშენებინა, a-gv-e-šen-eb-in-a	აგვეშენებინოს, a-gv-e-šen-eb-in-o-s
2p	აგიშენებიათ, a-g-i-šen-eb-i-a-t	აგეშენებინათ, a-g-e-šen-eb-in-a-t	აგეშენებინოთ, a-g-e-šen-eb-in-o-t
3p	აუშენებიათ, a-u-šen-eb-i-a-t	აეშენებინათ, a-e-šen-eb-in-a-t	აეშენებინოთ, a-e-šen-eb-in-o-t

Notes

¹ The imperfective screeve of class 1 verbs always takes the strong suffixal nominal marker -i

² The present subjunctive screeve of class 1 verbs always takes the weak suffixal nominal marker -e

³ Class 1 verbs which take the weak suffixal nominal marker in the aorist screeve, take the -o- nominal marker in the optative screeve, and verbs which take the strong suffixal nominal marker in the aorist screeve, take the -a- nominal marker in the optative screeve.

† The perfective screeve of class 1 verbs always uses the -i- versioner.

‡ The pluperfect and the perfect subjunctive screeves of class 1 verbs always employ the -e- versioner.

== Class 2 (intransitive verbs) ==
- In class 2 verbs, the subject is in the nominative case for all series, using the v- set marker. Indirect objects (the benefactor or possessive) are indicated with the m- set marker.
- The pattern of preverbs and thematic suffixes is generally the same as with class 1 verbs, except in the perfective series.
- Almost all intransitives utilise the thematic suffix -eb in formation. Additionally, intransitives may use formational affixes: resulting in a total of three types of formation pattern in intransitives:
1. prefixal: i- appears immediately before the verb root
2. suffixal: -d appears immediately after the verb root
3. markerless: no affixes appear

Below is a full conjugation of an intransitive verb:

Verb root

ბად, bad; infinite form დაბადება, dabadeba (to be born)

This verb exhibits the prefixal intransitive pattern; ი-, i- is placed immediately before the verb root in all series apart from the perfective.

Present subseries

The thematic suffix -eb is present, without the preverb:

	Present indicative	Imperfect	Present subjunctive
1s	ვიბადები, v-i-bad-eb-i	ვიბადებოდი, v-i-bad-eb-od-i	ვიბადებოდე, v-i-bad-eb-od-e
2s	იბადები, i-bad-eb-i	იბადებოდი, i-bad-eb-od-i	იბადებოდე, i-bad-eb-od-e
3s	იბადება, i-bad-eb-a	იბადებოდა, i-bad-eb-od-a	იბადებოდეს, i-bad-eb-od-e-s
1p	ვიბადებით, v-i-bad-eb-i-t	ვიბადებოდით, v-i-bad-eb-od-i-t	ვიბადებოდეთ, v-i-bad-eb-od-e-t
2p	იბადებით, i-bad-eb-i-t	იბადებოდით, i-bad-eb-od-i-t	იბადებოდეთ, i-bad-eb-od-e-t
3p	იბადებიან, i-bad-eb-i-an	იბადებოდნენ, i-bad-eb-od-nen	იბადებოდნენ, i-bad-eb-od-nen

Future subseries

The preverb da- emerges:

	Future indicative	Conditional	Future subjunctive
1s	დავიბადები, da-v-i-bad-eb-i	დავიბადებოდი, da-v-i-bad-eb-od-i	დავიბადებოდე, da-v-i-bad-eb-od-e
2s	დაიბადები, da-i-bad-eb-i	დაიბადებოდი, da-i-bad-eb-od-i	დაიბადებოდე, da-i-bad-eb-od-e
3s	დაიბადება, da-i-bad-eb-a	დაიბადებოდა, da-i-bad-eb-od-a	დაიბადებოდეს, da-i-bad-eb-od-e-s
1p	დავიბადებით, da-v-i-bad-eb-i-t	დავიბადებოდით, da-v-i-bad-eb-od-i-t	დავიბადებოდეთ, da-v-i-bad-eb-od-e-t
2p	დაიბადებით, da-i-bad-eb-i-t	დაიბადებოდით, da-i-bad-eb-od-i-t	დაიბადებოდეთ, da-i-bad-eb-od-e-t
3p	დაიბადებიან, da-i-bad-eb-i-an	დაიბადებოდნენ, da-i-bad-eb-od-nen	დაიბადებოდნენ, da-i-bad-eb-od-nen

Aorist series

The preverb is present; the thematic suffix is lost:

	Aorist indicative	Optative
1s	დავიბადე, da-v-i-bad-e	დავიბადო, da-v-i-bad-o
2s	დაიბადე, da-i-bad-e	დაიბადო, da-i-bad-o
3s	დაიბადა, da-i-bad-a	დაიბადოს, da-i-bad-o-s
1p	დავიბადეთ, da-v-i-bad-e-t	დავიბადოთ, da-v-i-bad-o-t
2p	დაიბადეთ, da-i-bad-e-t	დაიბადოთ, da-i-bad-o-t
3p	დაიბადნენ, da-i-bad-nen	დაიბადონ, da-i-bad-o-n

Perfective series

Formation comprises the past participle (da-(v)-bad-eb-ul-i), followed by a form of the copula:

	Perfect	Pluperfect	Perfect subjunctive
1s	დავბადებულვარ, da-v-bad-eb-ul-v-a-r	დავბადებულიყავი, da-v-bad-eb-ul-i-q̇av-i	დავბადებულიყო, da-v-bad-eb-ul-i-q̇-o
2s	დაბადებულხარ, da-bad-eb-ul-x-a-r	დაბადებულიყავი, da-bad-eb-ul-i-q̇av-i	დაბადებულიყო, da-bad-eb-ul-i-q̇-o
3s	დაბადებულა, da-bad-eb-ul-a	დაბადებულიყო, da-bad-eb-ul-i-q̇-o	დაბადებულიყოს, da-bad-eb-ul-i-q̇-o-s
1p	დავბადებულვართ, da-v-bad-eb-ul-v-a-r-t	დავბადებულიყავით, da-v-bad-eb-ul-i-q̇av-i-t	დავბადებულიყოთ, da-v-bad-eb-ul-i-q̇-o-t
2p	დაბადებულხართ, da-bad-eb-ul-x-a-r-t	დაბადებულიყავით, da-bad-eb-ul-i-q̇av-i-t	დაბადებულიყოთ, da-bad-eb-ul-i-q̇-o-t
3p	დაბადებულან, da-bad-eb-ul-an	დაბადებულიყვნენ, da-bad-eb-ul-i-q̇v-nen	დაბადებულიყონ, da-bad-eb-ul-i-q̇-o-n

== Class 3 (medial verbs) ==
- These verbs have the same case marking as class 1 verbs (i.e. aorist series - ergative-nominative; present/future series - nominative-dative; perfective series - dative-nominative), the difference being that they describe intransitive activities: verbs expressing movement, sound and weather are found in this category.
- Therefore, many class 3 verbs do not take a direct object; however some may (e.g. tamašob - to play), whilst others take an obligatory direct object (e.g. q̇idulob - to buy).
- Almost all medials form the future/aorist in the same, very regular, way, outlined below.

Full conjugation follows:

Verb root

თამაშ, tamaš; infinite form თამაშობა, tamašoba (to play)

Present subseries

The thematic suffix -ob is present:

	Present indicative	Imperfect	Present subjunctive
1s	ვთამაშობ, v-tamaš-ob	ვთამაშობდი, v-tamaš-ob-d-i	ვთამაშობდე, v-tamaš-ob-d-e
2s	თამაშობ, tamaš-ob	თამაშობდი, tamaš-ob-d-i	თამაშობდე, tamaš-ob-d-e
3s	თამაშობს, tamaš-ob-s	თამაშობდა, tamaš-ob-d-a	თამაშობდეს, tamaš-ob-d-e-s
1p	ვთამაშობთ, v-tamaš-ob-t	ვთამაშობდით, v-tamaš-ob-d-i-t	ვთამაშობდეთ, v-tamaš-ob-d-e-t
2p	თამაშობთ, tamaš-ob-t	თამაშობდით, tamaš-ob-d-i-t	თამაშობდეთ, tamaš-ob-d-e-t
3p	თამაშობენ, tamaš-ob-en	თამაშობდნენ, tamaš-ob-d-nen	თამაშობდნენ, tamaš-ob-d-nen

Future subseries

A type of preverb i- emerges, in combination with the thematic suffix -eb which replaces -ob (or any thematic suffix):

	Future indicative	Conditional	Future subjunctive
1s	ვითამაშებ, v-i-tamaš-eb	ვითამაშებდი, v-i-tamaš-eb-d-i	ვითამაშებდე, v-i-tamaš-eb-d-e
2s	ითამაშებ, i-tamaš-eb	ითამაშებდი, i-tamaš-eb-d-i	ითამაშებდე, i-tamaš-eb-d-e
3s	ითამაშებს, i-tamaš-eb-s	ითამაშებდა, i-tamaš-eb-d-a	ითამაშებდეს, i-tamaš-eb-d-e-s
1p	ვითამაშებთ, v-i-tamaš-eb-t	ვითამაშებდით, v-i-tamaš-eb-d-i-t	ვითამაშებდეთ, v-i-tamaš-eb-d-e-t
2p	ითამაშებთ, i-tamaš-eb-t	ითამაშებდით, i-tamaš-eb-d-i-t	ითამაშებდეთ, i-tamaš-eb-d-e-t
3p	ითამაშებენ, i-tamaš-eb-en	ითამაშებდნენ, i-tamaš-eb-d-nen	ითამაშებდნენ, i-tamaš-eb-d-nen

Aorist series

Based on the future form with prefix, but with the loss of the thematic suffix:

	Aorist indicative	Optative
1s	ვითამაშე, v-i-tamaš-e	ვითამაშო, v-i-tamaš-o
2s	ითამაშე, i-tamaš-e	ითამაშო, i-tamaš-o
3s	ითამაშა, i-tamaš-a	ითამაშოს, i-tamaš-o-s
1p	ვითამაშეთ, v-i-tamaš-e-t	ვითამაშოთ, v-i-tamaš-o-t
2p	ითამაშეთ, i-tamaš-e-t	ითამაშოთ, i-tamaš-o-t
3p	ითამაშეს, i-tamaš-es	ითამაშონ, i-tamaš-o-n

Perfect series

There is no preverb or thematic suffix; subjects are marked in the same way as in class 1 (i.e. with the m- set and appropriate formant vowels). The object (if present in context) is assumed to be 3rd person singular. N.B in this series, for some unknown reason, all screeves allow an optional -n- directly after the stem.

	Perfect	Pluperfect	Perfect subjunctive
1s	მითამაშ(ნ)ია, m-i-tamaš-(n-)i-a	მეთამაშ(ნ)ა, m-e-tamaš-(n-)a	მეთამაშ(ნ)ოს, m-e-tamaš-(n-)o-s
2s	გითამაშ(ნ)იაg-i-tamaš-(n-)i-a	გეთამაშ(ნ)ა, g-e-tamaš-(n-)a	გეთამაშ(ნ)ოს, g-e-tamaš-(n-)-o-s
3s	უთამაშ(ნ)ია, u-tamaš-(n-)i-a	ეთამაშ(ნ)ა, e-tamaš-(n-)a	ეთამაშ(ნ)ოს, e-tamaš-(n-)-o-s
1p	გვითამაშ(ნ)ია, gv-i-tamaš-(n-)-i-a	გვეთამაშ(ნ)ა, gv-e-tamaš-(n-)a	გვეთამაშ(ნ)ოს, gv-e-tamaš-(n-)-o-s
2p	გითამაშ(ნ)ია, g-i-tamaš-(n-)i-a-t	გეთამაშ(ნ)ათ, g-e-tamaš-(n-)a-t	გეთამაშ(ნ)ოს, g-e-tamaš-(n-)-o-t
3p	უთამაშ(ნ)იათ, u-tamaš-(n-)i-a-t	ეთამაშ(ნ)ათ, e-tamaš-(n-)a-t	ეთამაშ(ნ)ოს, e-tamaš-(n-)-o-t

== Class 4 (indirect or 'inversion' verbs) ==
- This class of verb is known as indirect or 'inverted' as it marks the logical subject with the indirect object marker set (m- set) and the direct object with the subject marker set (v- set). Nouns are declined in agreement: the logical subject is in the dative, and object in the nominative (or sometimes genitive, as in gogo-s (dat.) ʒaɣl-is (gen.) e-šin-i-a - the girl is afraid of the dog).
- Verbs in this class denote feelings, sensations and endurant states of being (see also stative verbs), including verbs such as q̇av - to have (X, animate), kv - to have (X, inanimate) q̇var - to love and nd - to want.
- Class 4 verbs also include 'desideratives' (verbs of desiring), created using the circumfix e-…-eb (compare ceḳv-av-s 'he dances' and e-ceḳv-eb-a 'he feels like dancing').

The verb paradigm follows. For simplicity, the verb form always assumes a 3rd person singular object:

Verb root

ყვარ, q̇var - to love

Present subseries

The verb takes the 'subjective' versioniser i- in the 1st and 2nd persons, 'objective' u- in the 3rd person. Note the ending of the 2nd and 3rd person plural (subject) marker -t takes precedence over the 3rd person singular (object) marker -s:

	Present indicative	Imperfect	Present subjunctive
1s	მიყვარს, m-i-q̇var-s	მიყვარდა, m-i-q̇var-d-a	მიყვარდეს, m-i-q̇var-d-e-s
2s	გიყვარს, g-i-q̇var-s	გიყვარდა, g-i-q̇var-d-a	გიყვარდეს, g-i-q̇var-d-e-s
3s	უყვარს, u-q̇var-s	უყვარდა, u-q̇var-d-a	უყვარდეს, u-q̇var-d-e-s
1p	გვიყვარს, gv-i-q̇var-s	გვიყვარდა, gv-i-q̇var-d-a	გვიყვარდეს, gv-i-q̇var-d-e-s
2p	გიყვართ, g-i-q̇var-t	გიყვარდათ, g-i-q̇var-d-a-t	გიყვარდეთ, g-i-q̇var-d-e-t
3p	უყვართ, u-q̇var-t	უყვარდათ, u-q̇var-d-a-t	უყვარდეთ, u-q̇var-d-e-t

Future subseries

Here the verb forms its screeves by using a pre-radical vowel e-, and the thematic suffix -eb, in a way similar to the class 2 verbs (but without the preverb):

	Future indicative	Conditional	Future subjunctive
1s	მეყვარება, m-e-q̇var-eb-a	მეყვარებოდა, m-e-q̇var-eb-od-a	მეყვარებოდეს, m-e-q̇var-eb-od-e-s
2s	გეყვარება, g-e-q̇var-eb-a	გეყვარებოდა, g-e-q̇var-eb-od-a	გეყვარებოდეს, g-e-q̇var-eb-od-e-s
3s	ეყვარება, e-q̇var-eb-a	ეყვარებოდა, e-q̇var-eb-od-a	ეყვარებოდეს, e-q̇var-eb-od-e-s
1p	გვეყვარება, gv-e-q̇var-eb-a	გვეყვარებოდა, gv-e-q̇var-eb-od-a	გვეყვარებოდეს, gv-e-q̇var-eb-od-e-s
2p	გეყვარებათ, g-e-q̇var-eb-a-t	გეყვარებოდათ, g-e-q̇var-eb-od-a-t	გეყვარებოდეთ, g-e-q̇var-eb-od-e-t
3p	ეყვარებათ, e-q̇var-eb-a-t	ეყვარებოდათ, e-q̇var-eb-od-a-t	ეყვარებოდეთ, e-q̇var-eb-od-e-t

Aorist series

Since the verb does not have an aorist form, and uses the imperfect instead (like many other class 4 verbs), the aorist forms of šegiq̇vardeba 'you'll fall in love with X' are substituted:

	Aorist indicative	Optative
1s	შემიყვარდა, še-m-i-q̇var-d-a	შემიყვარდეს, še-m-i-q̇var-d-e-s
2s	შეგიყვარდა, še-g-i-q̇var-d-a	შეგიყვარდეს, še-g-i-q̇var-d-e-s
3s	შეუყვარდა, še-u-q̇var-d-a	შეუყვარდეს, še-u-q̇var-d-e-s
1p	შეგვიყვარდა, še-gv-i-q̇var-d-a	შეგვიყვარდეს, še-gv-i-q̇var-d-e-s
2p	შეგიყვარდათ, še-g-i-q̇var-d-a-t	შეგიყვარდეთ, še-g-i-q̇var-d-e-t
3p	შეუყვარდათ, še-u-q̇var-d-a-t	შეუყვარდეთ, še-u-q̇var-d-e-t

Perfect series

This series is not especially consistent: the perfect screeve uses versionisers before the root, whereas the pluperfect and perfect subjunctive screeves take no versioniser. The series forms using the suffix -eb, with -od as a further suffix in the pluperfect and perfect subjunctive screeves.

	Perfect	Pluperfect	Perfect subjunctive
1s	მყვარებია, m-q̇var-eb-i-a	მყვარებოდა, m-q̇var-eb-od-a	მყვარებოდეს, m-q̇var-eb-od-e-s
2s	გყვარებია, g-q̇var-eb-i-a	გყვარებოდა, g-q̇var-eb-od-a	გყვარებოდეს, g-q̇var-eb-od-e-s
3s	ჰყვარებია, h-q̇var-eb-i-a	ჰყვარებოდა, h-q̇var-eb-od-a	ჰყვარებოდეს, h-q̇var-eb-od-e-s
1p	გვყვარებია, gv-q̇var-eb-i-a	გვყვარებოდა, gv-q̇var-eb-od-a	გვყვარებოდეს, gv-q̇var-eb-od-e-s
2p	გყვარებიათ, g-q̇var-eb-i-a-t	გყვარებოდათ, g-q̇var-eb-od-a-t	გყვარებოდეთ, g-q̇var-eb-od-e-t
3p	ჰყვარებიათ, h-q̇var-eb-i-a-t	ჰყვარებოდათ, h-q̇var-eb-od-a-t	ჰყვარებოდეთ, h-q̇var-eb-od-e-t

N.B. It is important to bear in mind that each verb form given in the tables has a further five forms corresponding to the 1st and 2nd person singular direct objects, and the 1st, 2nd and 3rd person plural direct objects, giving a theoretical total of 396 bi-personal forms! In practice however these forms are not always distinct (for example the plurality of the 3rd person is not always present in the form). For further discussion, see 'Direct and indirect objects'.

== Direct and indirect objects ==
- The verb -c̣er- (წერ), "to write," (transitive verb)
  - Simplest, we have: v-c̣er (ვწერ), ("I am writing (it)") and c̣er-s (წერს), ("he/she is writing (it)").
  - Changing the version, the grammatical feature indicated by the versioner/version vowel, changes the role of the indirect object: v-c̣er is in the neutral version, which is the default version for most Class I verbs, and is indicated either by a zero marker or an -a- versioner, depending on the verb. In the objective version (which for Class I verbs usually changes the role of the indirect object to that of benefactor of the action or possessor of the direct object), the version vowel is -i- for 1st and 2nd person indirect objects and -u- for 3rd person indirect objects. Therefore, we have v-u-c̣er (ვუწერ) for "I am writing it for/on behalf of him/her".
  - In order to say "I am writing to you (singular)", we have to remember that you is the indirect object in this sentence. As stated in the verbal system, verbs which employ the v- set marker to indicate the subject, use the m- set marker to indicate the direct or the indirect object. Looking at the table of the m- set marker, we see that the prefixal nominal marker for the second person singular is g-. Therefore, "I am writing to you (singular)" in Georgian is g-c̣er (გწერ). If we want to say, "I am writing to you (plural)", then we have g-c̣er-t (გწერთ).
  - Note, however, that some ambiguities arise, as the verb encapsulates the indirect object. While g-c̣er-t (გწერთ) means "I am writing to you (plural)," it could also mean "he/she is writing to you (plural). This is because the plural indirect object "you (plural)" requires both the prefixal nominal marker g- and the plural marker -t. The rule in Georgian is that, if a consonant plural marker (-t) is to be attached to the verb complex, another suffixal consonant nominal marker has to be dropped. For example, one cannot say g-c̣er-s-t ("he/she is writing to you (plural)") in Georgian. Therefore, the verb, in cases like this, fails to indicate whether the performer of the action is the first person or the third person. One, then, has to consider the role of the verb in the entire sentence to understand the exact meaning of the verb.
- The verb -nd- (ნდ), "to want," belongs to indirect verb class (class 4).
  - Simplest, we have m-i-nd-a (მინდა), "I want," and u-nd-a (უნდა), "he/she wants."
  - When we want to construct "he wants me," me is the direct object. Since the verb "want" requires the m- set marker for the subject, it requires the v- set for the object (this is exactly the opposite in verb "write"). To do this, we need to put both the letter v- at the beginning of the verb and we need to add the auxiliary verb -var to the end (as auxiliary verbs are needed in the present and perfective screeves of indirect verbs when the direct object is the first or the second person). Therefore, we have v-u-nd-i-var (ვუნდივარ). The letter -u- right after the letter v- establishes the meaning that it is the third person who wants. To say, "you want me", we then have g-i-nd-i-var (გინდივარ). Here, the -i- means that it is the second person who wants.
  - Note that "he/she wants me" and "they want me" are both the same in Georgian: v-u-nd-i-var (ვუნდივარ). If one says, v-u-nd-i-var-t (ვუნდივართ), this rather means "he/she wants us." This is because the plurality of the subject is not reflected in the verbs that use the m- set marker when the direct object is either the first or the second person.
  - The Georgian language has perhaps one of the most complicated plural subject-verb and object-verb agreement systems. Even native speakers do not seem to have a consensus on the reflection of plurality to the verb. One general rule is that in the verbs that employ the v- set nominal marker, the priority of indicating the plurality of the subject is higher than that of the object. In the verbs that use the m- set nominal marker, this is reversed (just like everything else is reversed). That is why in the example of v-u-nd-i-var-t (ვუნდივართ) the plural marker -t at the end refers to the plurality of the object rather than the plurality of the subject.

== Preverbs ==
Preverbs in Georgian can either add directionality to a verb, or can change the meaning of the verb entirely. It is also important to use the appropriate versioner in each case.

Since preverbs are absent in the present series, it is important to consider the role of the verb in the context of the entire sentence as the verb by itself could convey any meaning in the present screeves.

- Root gh (ღ):
  - a-gh-eb-a (აღება), versioner: -i — "raise, lift up" (generally: upward motion)
  - amo-gh-eb-a (ამოღება), versioner: -i — "take out"
  - ga-gh-eb-a (გაღება), versioner: -a — "open"
  - gadmo-gh-eb-a (გადმოღება), versioner: -i — "take down"
  - gamo-gh-eb-a (გამოღება), versioner: -i — "give forth"
  - mi-gh-eb-a (მიღება), versioner: -i — "receive"
  - šemo-gh-eb-a (შემოღება), versioner: -i — "introduce"
  - c̣amo-gh-eb-a (წამოღება), versioner: -u — "carry"
- Root q̇r- (ყრ):
  - a-q̇r-a (აყრა), versioner: -i — "put forth, throw upward"
  - ga-q̇r-a (გაყრა), versioner: -u — "stick, put something through"
  - gada-q̇r-a (გადაყრა), versioner: none (Note: When used to mean "throw down to someone", the -u versioner is required.) — "throw down" (generally: downward motion)
  - gadmo-q̇r-a (გადმოყრა), V: -a — "cast down"
  - da-q̇r-a (დაყრა), versioner: none — "scatter, drop"
  - mo-q̇r-a (მოყრა), versioner: -a — "ask someone many questions"
  - še-q̇r-a (შეყრა), versioner: none — "gather together"
  - ča-q̇r-a (ჩაყრა), versioner: -a — "pour (onto someone's head)"
- Root c̣er- (წერ):
  - da-: da-c̣er-a (დაწერა) — "write"
  - a(gh)-: agh-c̣er-a (აღწერა) — "describe, description, census"
  - amo-: a-mo-c̣er-a (ამოწერა) — "write out, extract, sign off, deregister"
  - ča-: ča-c̣er-a (ჩაწერა) — "write into/onto (including files)"
  - ča-mo-: ča-mo-c̣er-a (ჩამოწერა) — "list (by writing), decommission"
  - mi-: mi-c̣er-a (მიწერა) — "write to someone"
  - mi-mo-: mi-mo-c̣er-a (მიმოწერა) — "correspondence, conversation (by post or mail)"
  - gada-: gada-c̣er-a (გადაწერა) — "copying text (or files) from one place to another"
  - gad-mo-: gad-mo-c̣er-a (გადმოწერა) — "copying/writing out text from its source; downloading files"
  - ga-: ga-c̣er-a (გაწერა) — "plan, stipulate"
  - ga-mo-: ga-mo-c̣er-a (გამოწერა) — "subscribe to (newspaper etc.); order, buy"
  - c̣a-: c̣a-c̣er-a (წაწერა) — "making/writing a note (on the document)"
