= Noala =

Noala may refer to:

- Lake Noala, a lake in the Upemba Depression
- Noala language
- Noala people, Australia

== See also ==
- Noale, a town in Venice, Veneto, Italy
