= Grammatical conjugation =

Contextual alterations of verbs

Part of the conjugation of the Spanish verb correr, "to run", the lexeme is "corr-". Red represents the speaker, purple the addressee (or speaker/hearer) and teal a third person. One person represents the singular number and two, the plural number. Dawn represents the past (specifically the preterite), noon the present and night the future.

In linguistics, conjugation (/ˌkɒn.dʒʊ.ˈɡeɪ.ʃən/, con-juu-GAY-shən) is the creation of derived forms of a verb from its principal parts by inflection (alteration of form according to rules of grammar). For instance, the verb break can be conjugated to form the words break, breaks, and broke. While English has a relatively simple conjugation, other languages such as French, Arabic or Spanish are more complex, with each verb having dozens of conjugated forms. Some languages such as Georgian, Basque, and Navajo have highly complex conjugation systems with hundreds of possible conjugations for every verb.

Verbs may inflect for grammatical categories such as person, number, gender, case, tense, aspect, mood, voice, possession, definiteness, politeness, causativity, clusivity, interrogatives, transitivity, valency, polarity, telicity, volition, mirativity, evidentiality, animacy, associativity, pluractionality, and reciprocity. Verbs may also be affected by agreement, polypersonal agreement, incorporation, noun class, noun classifiers, and verb classifiers. Agglutinative and polysynthetic languages tend to have the most complex conjugations, although some fusional languages such as Archi can also have extremely complex conjugation. Typically the principal parts are the root and/or several modifications of it (stems). All the different forms of the same verb constitute a lexeme, and the canonical form of the verb that is conventionally used to represent that lexeme (as seen in dictionary entries) is called a lemma.

The term conjugation is applied only to the inflection of verbs, and not of other parts of speech (inflection of nouns and adjectives is known as declension). It is also generally restricted to denoting the formation of finite forms of a verb – these may be referred to as conjugated forms, as opposed to non-finite forms, such as an infinitive, gerund, or participle which respectively comprise their own grammatical categories.

Conjugation is also the traditional term for a group of verbs that share a similar conjugation pattern in a particular language (a verb class). For example, Latin is said to have four conjugations of verbs. This means that any regular Latin verb can be conjugated in any person, number, tense, mood, and voice by knowing which of the four conjugation groups it belongs to, and its principal parts. A verb that does not follow all of the standard conjugation patterns of the language is said to be an irregular verb. The system of all conjugated variants of a particular verb or class of verbs is called a verb paradigm; this may be presented in the form of a conjugation table.

== Verbal agreement ==
Verbal agreement, or concord, is a morpho-syntactic construct in which properties of the subject and/or objects of a verb are indicated by the verb form. Verbs are then said to agree with their subjects (resp. objects).

Many English verbs exhibit subject agreement of the following sort: whereas I go, you go, we go, they go are all grammatical in standard English, he go is not (except in the subjunctive, as "They requested that he go with them"). Instead, a special form of the verb to go has to be used to produce he goes. On the other hand I goes, you goes etc. are not grammatical in standard English. (Things are different in some English dialects that lack agreement.) A few English verbs have no special forms that indicate subject agreement (I may, you may, he may), and the verb to be has an additional form am that can only be used with the pronoun I as the subject.

Verbs in written French exhibit more intensive agreement morphology than English verbs: je suis (I am), tu es ("you are", singular informal), elle est (she is), nous sommes (we are), vous êtes ("you are", plural), ils sont (they are). Historically, English used to have a similar verbal paradigm. Some historic verb forms are used by Shakespeare as slightly archaic or more formal variants (I do, thou dost, he doth) of the modern forms.

Some languages with verbal agreement can leave certain subjects implicit when the subject is fully determined by the verb form. In Spanish, for instance, subject pronouns do not need to be explicitly present, but in French, its close relative, they are obligatory. The Spanish equivalent to the French je suis (I am) can be simply soy (lit. "am"). The pronoun yo (I) in the explicit form yo soy is used only for emphasis or to clear ambiguity in complex texts.

Some languages have a richer agreement system in which verbs agree also with some or all of their objects. Ubykh exhibits verbal agreement for the subject, direct object, indirect object, benefaction and ablative objects (a.w3.s.xe.n.t'u.n, you gave it to him for me).

Basque can show agreement not only for subject, direct object and indirect object but it also can exhibit agreement for the listener as the implicit benefactor: autoa ekarri digute means "they brought us the car" (neuter agreement for the listener), but autoa ekarri ziguten means "they brought us the car" (agreement for feminine singular listener).

Languages with a rich agreement morphology facilitate relatively free word order without leading to increased ambiguity. The canonical word order in Basque is subject–object–verb, but all permutations of subject, verb and object are permitted.

=== Nonverbal person agreement ===
In some languages, predicative adjectives and copular complements receive a form of person agreement that is distinct from that used on ordinary predicative verbs. Although that is a form of conjugation in that it refers back to the person of the subject, it is not "verbal" because it always derives from pronouns that have become clitic to the nouns to which they refer. An example of nonverbal person agreement, along with contrasting verbal conjugation, can be found from Beja (person agreement affixes in bold):

- wun.tu.**wi**, "you (fem.) are big"
- hadá.b.**wa**, "you (masc.) are a sheik"
- **e**.n.fór, "he flees"

Another example can be found from Ket:

- fèmba.**di**, "I am a Tungus"
- **dɨ**.fen, "I am standing"

In Turkic, and a few Uralic and Australian Aboriginal languages, predicative adjectives and copular complements take affixes that are identical to those used on predicative verbs, but their negation is different. For example, in Turkish:

- koş.u.yor.**sun** "you are running"
- çavuş.**sun** "you are a sergeant"

Under negation, that becomes (negative affixes in bold):

- koş.**mu**.yor.sun "you are not running"
- çavuş **değil**.sin "you are not a sergeant"

Therefore, the person agreement affixes used with predicative adjectives and nominals in Turkic languages are considered to be nonverbal in character. In some analyses, they are viewed as a form of verbal takeover by a copular strategy.

== Factors that affect conjugation ==
These common grammatical categories affect how verbs can be conjugated:

- Finite verb forms:
  - Grammatical person
  - Grammatical number
  - Grammatical gender
  - Grammatical tense
  - Grammatical aspect
  - Grammatical mood
  - Grammatical voice
- Non-finite verb forms.

Here are other factors that may affect conjugation:

- Degree of formality (see T–V distinction, Honorific speech in Japanese, Korean speech levels)
- Clusivity (of personal pronouns)
- Transitivity
- Valency

== Examples ==
Indo-European languages usually inflect verbs for several grammatical categories in complex paradigms, although some, like English, have simplified verb conjugation to a large extent. Below is the conjugation of the verb to be in the present tense (of the infinitive, if it exists, and indicative moods), in English, German, Yiddish, Dutch, Afrikaans, Icelandic, Faroese, Swedish, Norwegian, Latvian, Bulgarian, Serbo-Croatian, Polish, Slovenian, Macedonian, Urdu or Hindi, Bengali, Persian, Latin, French, Italian, Spanish, Portuguese, Russian, Albanian, Armenian, Irish, Ukrainian, Ancient Attic Greek and Modern Greek. This is usually the most irregular verb. The similarities in corresponding verb forms may be noticed. Some of the conjugations may be disused, like the English thou-form, or have additional meanings, like the English you-form, which can also stand for second person singular or be impersonal.

"To be" in several Indo-European languages
Branch	Language	Present infinitive	Present indicative					
Branch	Language	Present infinitive	Singular persons			Plural persons		
Branch	Language	Present infinitive	1st	2nd	3rd	1st	2nd	3rd
Germanic	Proto-Germanic	*wesaną	*immi	*izi	*isti	*izum	*izud	*sindi
Germanic	Anglo-Saxon	wesan	eom	eart	is	sind sindon		
Germanic	English	be	am	are art^{1} beest^{1}	is are^{11}	are		
Germanic	German	sein	bin	bist	ist	sind	seid	sind
Germanic	Yiddish transliterated	זיין zayn	בין bin	ביסט bist	איז iz	זענען/זײַנען zenen/zaynen	זענט/זײַט zent/zayt	זענען/זײַנען zenen/zaynen
Germanic	Luxembourgish	sinn	sinn	bass	ass	sinn	sidd	sinn
Germanic	Dutch	zijn	ben	bent zijt^{2}	is	zijn		
Germanic	Afrikaans	wees	is					
Germanic	Old Norse	vesa vera	em	est ert	es er	erum	eruð	eru
Germanic	Icelandic	vera	er	ert	er	erum	eruð	eru
Germanic	Faroese	vera	eri	ert	er	eru		
Germanic	Norwegian	være^{3} (Bokmål) vera, vere^{4} (Nynorsk)	er					
Germanic	Danish	være	er					
Germanic	Swedish	vara	är			är äro^{5}		
Italic	Latin	esse	sum	es	est	sumus	estis	sunt
Italic	Italian	essere	sono	sei	è	siamo semo^{5}	siete sète^{5}	sono enno^{5}
Italic	French	être	suis	es	est	sommes	êtes	sont
Italic	Catalan	ésser ser	sóc	ets eres^{14}	és	som	sou	són
Italic	Lombard	vésser	(a) son	te sé	l'è	som sem^{5}	sî	i è (i) enn^{14}
Italic	Venetian	èsar	son	te si	el ze	semo	si	i ze
Italic	Spanish	ser	soy	eres	es	somos	sois son	son
Italic	Galician	ser	son	es	é	somos	sodes	son
Italic	Portuguese	ser	sou	és	é	somos	sois	são
Italic	Sardinian (LSC)	èssere	so	ses	est	semus	seis	sunt
Italic	Friulian	jessi	soi	sês	è	sin	sês	son
Italic	Neapolitan	èssere	songo, so	sî	è	simmo	site	songo, so
Italic	Romanian	a fi	sunt	ești	este	suntem	sunteți	sunt
Celtic	Irish	bheith	bím	bíonn		bímid	bíonn	
Celtic	Welsh (standard form)	bod	rydw	rwyt	mae	rydych	rydyn	maen
Celtic	Breton	bezañ	on	out	eo	omp	oc'h	int
Greek	Ancient^{6} transliterated	εἶναι eînai	εἰμί eimí	εἶ eî	ἐστί estí	ἐσμέν esmén	ἐστέ esté	εἰσί eisí
Greek	Modern transliterated	όντας^{7} óntas	είμαι eímai	είσαι eísai	είναι eínai	είμαστε eímaste	είσ(ασ)τε eís(as)te	είναι eínai
Albanian		me qenë	jam	je	është	jemi	jeni	janë
Armenian	Western transliterated	ըլլալ ĕllal	Եմ em	ես es	է ē	ենք enk‘	էք ēk‘	են en
Armenian	Eastern transliterated	լինել linel	Եմ em	ես es	է ē	ենք enk‘	եք ek‘	են en
Slavic	Czech	být	jsem	jsi	je	jsme	jste	jsou
Slavic	Slovak	byť	som	si	je	sme	ste	sú
Slavic	Polish	być	jestem	jesteś	jest	jesteśmy	jesteście	są
Slavic	Russian transliterated	быть byt'	есть yest'					
Slavic	Ukrainian transliterated	бути buty	є ye					
Slavic	Serbo-Croatian strong	biti	jesam	jesi	jest(e)	jesmo	jeste	jesu
Slavic	Serbo-Croatian clitic	none	sam	si	je	smo	ste	su
Slavic	Slovenian	biti	sem	si	je	smo	ste	so
Slavic	Bulgarian transliterated	none	съм săm	си si	е e	сме sme	сте ste	са să
Slavic	Macedonian transliterated	none	сум sum	си si	е e	сме sme	сте ste	се se
Baltic	Latvian	būt	esmu	esi	ir	esam	esat	ir
Baltic	Lithuanian	būti	esu	esi	yra	esame	esate	yra
Indo-Iranian	Persian transliterated	بودن budan	ام æm	ای ei	(است (ا æst (æ)^{10}	ایم eem	(اید (این eed (spoken: een)	(اند (ان and (spoken: an)
Indo-Iranian	Sanskrit transliterated	अस्ति asti	अस्मि asmi	असि asi	अस्ति asti	स्मः smah	स्थ stha	सन्ति santi
Indo-Iranian	Hindustani Devanagari Script Perso-Arabic Script transliterated (ISO 15819)	होना ہونا honā	हूँ ہوں hūm̥	है ہے hai		हैं ہیں haim̥	हो ہو ho	हैं ہیں haim̥
Indo-Iranian	Marathi transliterated (ISO 15819)	असणे asṇe	आहे āhe	आहेस āhes	आहे āhe	आहोत āhot	आहात āhāt	आहेत āhet
Indo-Iranian	Gujarati transliterated (ISO 15819)	હોવું hovũ	છું chũ	છે che		છીએ chīe	છો cho	છે che
Indo-Iranian	Bengali transliterated (ISO 15819)	হওয়া hôoā	হই hoi	হও^{12} hôo	হয়^{12} hôy	হই hoi	হও^{12} hôo	হয়^{12} hôy
Indo-Iranian	Assamese transliterated (ISO 15819)	হোৱা hüa	হওঁ hoü̃	হোৱা hüa	হয় hoy	হওঁ hoü̃	হোৱা hüa	হয় hoy

^{1} Archaic, poetical; used only with the pronoun 'thou'.
^{2} In Flemish dialects.
^{3} In the bokmål written standard.
^{4} In the nynorsk written standard. vera and vere are both alternate forms.
^{5} Archaic
^{6} Attic.
^{7} 'eínai' is only used as a noun ("being, existence").
^{8} Ptc: qenë.
^{9} In the Tosk and Geg dialects, respectively.
^{10} Existential: هست (hæst) has another meaning. Usage of (æ) is considered to be colloquial, now. See, Indo-European copula
^{11} With the Singular they 3rd person pronoun.
^{12} Bengali verbs are further conjugated according to formality. There are three verb forms for 2nd person pronouns: হও (hôo, familiar), হোস (hoś, very familiar) and হন (hôn, polite). Also two forms for 3rd person pronouns: হয় (hôy, familiar) and হন (hôn, polite). Plural verb forms are exact same as singular.
^{13} Valencian.
^{14} Western varieties only.

== Conjugation classes ==
=== Pama-Nyungan languages ===
One common feature of Pama–Nyungan languages, the largest family of Australian Aboriginal languages, is the notion of conjugation classes, which are a set of groups into which each lexical verb falls. They determine how a verb is conjugated for Tense–aspect–mood. The classes can but do not universally correspond to the transitivity or valency of the verb in question. Generally, of the two to six conjugation classes in a Pama-Nyungan language, two classes are open with a large membership and allow for new coinages, and the remainder are closed and of limited membership.

==== Wati ====
In Wati languages, verbs generally fall into four classes:

- l class
- ø class
- n class
- ng class

They are labelled by using common morphological components of verb endings in each respective class in infinitival forms. In the Wanman language these each correspond to la, ya, rra, and wa verbs respectively.

Example Verb Conjugations in Warnman
Class	Past	Present	Future	Imperative	Past Continuous	Habitual
LA	-rna	-npa/-rni	-nku	-la	-rninya	la
LA	waka-rna	waka-rni	waka-nku	waka-la	waka-rninya	waka-la
LA	speared	is spearing	will spear	spear it!	used to spear	spears
YA	-nya	-manyi	-ku	-ø/-ya	-minya	-ø/-ya
YA	wanti-nya	wanti-manyi	wanti-ku	wanti-ya	wanti-minya	wanti-ya
YA	stayed	is staying	will stay	stay!	used to stay	stays
RRA	-na	-npa	-nku	-rra	-ninya	-rra
RRA	ya-na	ya-npa	ya-nku	ya-rra	ya-ninya	ya-rra
RRA	went	is going	will go	go!	used to go	goes
WA	-nya	-nganyi	-ngku	-wa	-nganyinya	-wa
WA	pi-nya	pi-nganyi	pi-ngku	pi-wa	pi-nganyinya	pi-wa
WA	hit	is hitting	will hit	hit it!	used to hit	hits

See also a similar table of verb classes and conjugations in Pitjantjatjara, a Wati language wherein the correlating verb classes are presented below also by their imperative verbal endings -la, -ø, -ra and -wa respectively

Example Verb Conjugations in Pitjantjatjara
Class	Past	Present	Future	Imperative	Past Continuous	Habitual
LA	-nu	-ni	-lku	-la	-ningi	-lpai
LA	kati-nu	kati-ni	kati-lku	kati-la	kati-ningi	kati-lpai
LA	took	is taking	will take	take it!	used to take	takes
ø	-ngu	-nyi	-ku	-ø	-ngi	-pai
ø	tawa-ngu	tawa-nyi	tawa-ku	tawa-ø	tawa-ngi	tawa-pai
ø	dug	is digging	will dig	dig!	used to dig	digs
RA	-nu	-nangi	-nkuku	-ra	-nangi	-nkupai
RA	a-nu	a-nangi	a-nkuku	a-ra	a-nangi	a-nkupai
RA	went	is going	will go	go!	used to go	goes
WA	-ngu	-nganyi	-nguku	-wa	-ngangi	-ngkupai
WA	pu-ngu	pu-nganyi	pu-nguku	pu-wa	pu-ngangi	pu-ngkupai
WA	hit	is hitting	will hit	hit it!	used to hit	hits

==== Ngayarta ====
Ngarla, a member of the Ngayarda sub-family of languages has a binary conjugation system labelled:

- l class
- ø class

In the case of Ngarla, there is a notably strong correlation between conjugation class and transitivity, with transitive/ditransitive verbs falling in the l-class and intransitive/semi-transitive verbs in the ø-class.

Example Verb Conjugations in Ngarla
Class	Present	Remote Past	Past	Past Continuous	Habitual	Future	Speculative	Purposive	Optative	Present Contrafactual	Past Contrafactual	Anticipatory
L	-rri	-rnta	-rnu	-yinyu	-yirnta	-n	-mpi	-lu	-nmara	-rrima	-nmarnta	-rnamarta
L	jaa-rri	jaa-rnta	jaa-rnu	jaa-yinyu	jaa-yirnta	jaa-n	jaa-mpi	jaa-lu	jaa-nmara	jaa-rrima	jaa-nmarnta	jaa-rnmarta
L	is chopping	chopped (long ago)	chopped	used to chop	chops	will chop	could have chopped	in order to chop	ought to chop	were x chopping	had x chopped	should x chop
ø	-yan	-rnta	-nyu	-yanu	-yanta	-Ø	-mpi	-kura	-mara	-yanma	-marnta	-nyamarta
ø	warni-yan	warni-rnta	warni-nyu	warni-yanu	warni-yanta	warni-Ø	warni-rnpi	warni-kura	warni-mara	warni-yanma	warni-marnta	warni-nyamarta
ø	is falling	fell (long ago)	fell	used to fall	falls	will fall	could have fallen	in order to fall	ought to fall	were x falling	had x fallen	should x fall

These classes even extend to how verbs are nominalized as instruments with the l-class verb including the addition of an /l/ before the nominalizing suffix and the blank class remaining blank:

l-class example:

Kunyjarta-lu mara ku-rnu parnu-nga warnta pirri-lpunyjarri, kurni-rnu kunyjarta kurri
Woman-ERG hand CAUS-PST 3SG-GEN stick dig-INS throw-PST woman teenager
‘(The) woman caused her digging stick to be in (the) hand (i.e. picked up her digging stick), (and) threw (it) at (the) girl.’

ø-class example

Jarrari-punyjarri waa-n ngajapa pinurru ngaya nyali ja-lu
light-INS give-FUT 1SG.LOC fire 1SG.NOM light CAUS-PURP
‘(A) match (lit. something to light with) give on (i.e. to) me, (a) fire I intend to light.’

==== Yidiny ====
Yidiny has a ternary verb class system with two open classes and one closed class (~20 members). Verbs are classified as:

- -n class (open, intransitive/semi-transitive)
- -l class (open, transitive/ditransitive)
- -r class (closed, intransitive)

Example Verb Conjugations in Yidiny
Class	imperative	Present/Future	Past	Purposive	Apprehensive
N	-n	-ng	-nyu	-na	-ntyi
N	nyina-n	nyina-ng	nyina-nyu	nyina-na	nyina-ntyi
N	sit!	is sitting / will sit	sat	in order to sit	lest x sit
L	-ø	-l	-lnyu	-lna	-ltyi
L	patya-ø	patya-l	patya-lnyu	patya-lna	patya-ltyi
L	bite it!	is biting / will bite	bit	in order to bite	lest x bite
R	-rr	-r	-rnyu	-rna	-rtyi
R	pakya-rr	pakya-r	pakya-rnyu	-pakya-rna	pakya-rtyi
R	feel sore!	is feeling / will feel sore	felt sore	in order to feel sore	lest x feel sore

== See also ==
- Agreement (linguistics)
- Declension (nouns, adjectives, etc.)
- Inflection
- Redundancy (linguistics)
- Screeve
- Strong inflection
- Verb
- Verb argument
- Volition (linguistics)
- Weak inflection

=== Conjugations by language ===
- Category:Grammatical conjugation
- Indo-European copula
- Archivium: Italian verbs conjugator, for regular and irregular verbs
