= Laz grammar =

Grammar of the Laz language

Laz is a Kartvelian language. It is sometimes considered as a southern dialect of Zan languages, the northern dialect being the Mingrelian language.

Today, the area where Laz is spoken stretches from the village Sarpi of Khelvachauri district in Georgia to the village Kemer of Rize province in Turkey. Laz is spoken also in Western Turkey in the villages created by Laz muhajirs in 1877–1878. In Georgia, out of Sarpi, the Laz language islets were also in Abkhazia, but the fate of them is obscure at present.

Laz is divided into three dialects: Khopa-Chkhala, Vitze-Arkabe and Atina-Artasheni. Dialectical classification is mainly conditioned by phonetic characteristics. More specifically, the crucial point is the reflexes of the Kartvelian phoneme [qʼ], which is maintained only in the Khopa-Chkhala dialect but has different reflections in Vitze-Arkabe and Atina-Artasheni dialects (see below).

== Phonology and writing system ==
=== Vowels ===
Laz vowel inventory consists of five sounds: a, e, i, o, u.

Laz vowel scheme
	front	back	
	front	nonlabial	labial
high	i [i]		u [u]
mid	e [ɛ]		o [ɔ]
low		a [ɑ]	

=== Consonants ===
The consonant inventory of Laz varies among the dialects. A full set of sounds is present in the Khopa-Chkhala dialect, while the Vitze-Arkabe and Atina-Artasheni dialects lost glottalized uvular q.

Consolidated table of Laz consonants
			labial	dental	alveolar	velar	uvular	laryngeal
nasals			m ⟨m⟩	n ⟨n⟩				
stops	voiced		b ⟨b⟩	d ⟨d⟩		ɡ ⟨g⟩		
stops	voiceless	aspirated	p ⟨p⟩	t ⟨t⟩		k ⟨k⟩		
stops	voiceless	glottalized	pʼ ⟨p̌⟩	tʼ ⟨t̆⟩		kʼ ⟨ǩ⟩	qʼ ⟨q⟩	
affricates	voiced			d͡z ⟨ž⟩	d͡ʒ ⟨c⟩			
affricates	voiceless	aspirated		t͡s ⟨ʒ⟩	t͡ʃ ⟨ç⟩			
affricates	voiceless	glottalized		t͡sʼ ⟨ǯ⟩	t͡ʃʼ ⟨ç̌⟩			
fricatives	voiced		v ⟨v⟩	z ⟨z⟩	ʒ ⟨j⟩	ɣ ⟨ğ⟩		
fricatives	voiceless		f ⟨f⟩	s ⟨s⟩	ʃ ⟨ş⟩	x ⟨x⟩		h ⟨h⟩
liquids				l ⟨l⟩	r ⟨r⟩			
glides					j ⟨y⟩			

=== Phonological processes ===
==== Uvular q sound change ====
Glottalized uvular q is preserved only in the Khopa-Chkhala dialect before the vowels and the consonants v and l. This sound is also evidenced after glottalized stops and affricates in several words, such as p̌qorop (I love smb./sth.); ǩqorop (I love you); t̆qubi (twins), ǯqv-/ǯqvin- (to reconcile); ç̌qint̆i (fresh-soft and unripe). But in the most of cases *t̆q → t̆ǩ; *ǯq → ǯǩ; *ç̌q → ç̌ǩ.

In the Vitze-Arkabe dialect, in the neighborhood of consonants *q → ǩ (exception is the verb ovapu ← *oqvapu "to be"). In the word-initial prevocalic and in the intervocalic positions *q → ∅.

In Atina-Artasheni dialect:

- in word-initial prevocalic position q → ∅. E.g. *qoropa → oropa "love", *qona → ona "cornfield" etc.
- in intervocalic position *q → y/∅. E.g. *loqa → *loʔa → loya/loa "sweet", *luqu → *luʔu → luu "cabbage" etc.
- word-initial qv → ǩv/v. E.g. qvali → ǩvali/vali "cheese, *qvaci → ǩvaci/vaci "testicle" etc.
- intervocalic qv → y. E.g. *oqvapu → oyapu "to be/become", *iqven → iyen "s/he will be/become" etc.
- in all other cases q → ∅

==== Regressive assimilation ====
The most common types are:

- regressive voicing:
  - s → z
  - t → d
  - k → g
  - ş → j
  - ç → c
  - p → b
- regressive devoicing:
  - b → p
  - g → k
- regressive glottalization
  - b → p̌
  - p → p̌
  - g → ǩ

==== Dissimilative deletion of consonant ====
In some morphological contexts featuring two consonants n split only with a vowel, the former can be deleted. miqonun → miqoun (I have {an animate object}), iqvasinon → iqvasion (s/he will be), mulunan → *muluan → mulvan (they are coming).

Another dissimilation, presumably sporadic, occurs in deǩiǩe → deiǩe (minute); note also that the Arabic source of this word دقيقة daqīqa contains a uvular [q], and as above uvulars are unstable in Laz.

==== Intervocalic reduction of r ====
This process is evidenced in the Khopa-Chkhala and Vitze-Arkabe dialects, where in intervocalic position facultatively r → y → ∅.

==== Palatalization of velars ====
In the Atina-Artasheni dialect, the velars followed by the front vowels e and i and the glide y transform to alveolar affricates:

- g → c
- ǩ → ç̌
- k → ç

=== Alphabet ===
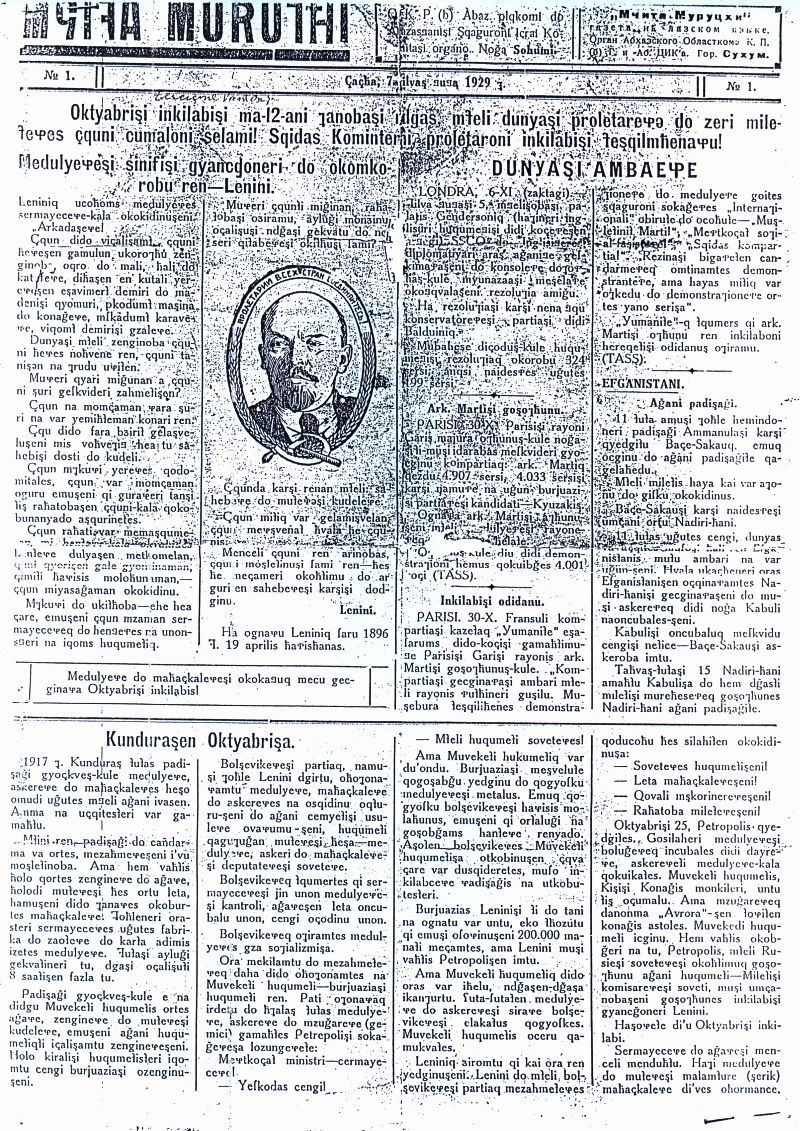
A Laz newspaper in 1928

Laz is written in a Georgian script or in the Latin script (as used in Turkish, but with specific Laz extensions).

Georgian (Mkhedruli)	Latin (Turkey)	Latin (rare)	IPA
Orthographic alphabets		Transcriptions	
ა	a	a	ɑ
ბ	b	b	b
გ	g	g	ɡ
დ	d	d	d
ე	e	e	ɛ
ვ	v	v	v
ზ	z	z	z
თ	t	t	t
ი	i	i	i
კ	ǩ, or kʼ	ḳ	kʼ
ლ	l	l	l
მ	m	m	m
ნ	n	n	n
ჲ	y	y	j
ო	o	o	ɔ
პ	p̌, or pʼ	ṗ	pʼ
ჟ	j	ž	ʒ
რ	r	r	r
ს	s	s	s
ტ	t̆, or tʼ	ṭ	tʼ
უ	u	u	u
ფ	p	p	p
ქ	k	k	k
ღ	ğ	ɣ	ɣ
ყ	q	qʼ	qʼ
შ	ş	š	ʃ
ჩ	ç	č	t͡ʃ
ც	ʒ, or з	c	t͡s
ძ	ž, or zʼ	ʒ	d͡z
წ	ǯ, or зʼ	ċ	t͡sʼ
ჭ	ç̌, or çʼ	č’	t͡ʃʼ
ხ	x	x	x
ჯ	c	ǯ	d͡ʒ
ჰ	h	h	h
ჶ	f	f	f

== Grammatical cases ==
Laz has eight grammatical cases: nominative, ergative, dative, genitive, lative, ablative, instrumental and almost extinct adverbial.

	Marker
Nominative	-i/-e
Ergative	-k
Dative	-s
Genitive	-iş
Lative	-işa
Ablative	-işe
Instrumental	-ite
Adverbial	-ot

=== Example of adjective declension ===
	Marker	Stem: mcveş- ("old")
Nominative	-i	mcveş-i
Ergative	-k	mcveş-i-k
Dative	-s	mcveş-i-s
Genitive	-iş	mcveş-iş
Lative	-işa	mcveş-işa
Ablative	-işe	mcveş-işe
Instrumental	-ite	mcveş-ite
Adverbial	-ot	mcveş-ot

=== Example of noun declension ===
	Marker	Stem: ǩoç- ("man")
Nominative	-i	ǩoç-i
Ergative	-k	ǩoç-i-k
Dative	-s	ǩoç-i-s
Genitive	-iş	ǩoç-iş
Lative	-işa	ǩoç-işa
Ablative	-işe	ǩoç-işe
Instrumental	-ite	ǩoç-ite
Adverbial	-ot	n/a

== Nouns ==
As in other South Caucasian languages, Laz distinguishes two classes of nouns and classifies objects as:

- 'Intelligent' entities. Respective interrogative is mi? (who?)
- 'Non-intelligent' entities. Respective interrogative is mu? (what?)

=== Noun classification scheme ===
Concrete			Abstract
Animate		Inanimate	
Human and "sentient" beings (e.g. God, deities, angels)	Animals	Inanimate physical entities	Abstract objects
Intelligent	Non-Intelligent		
mi? ("who?")	mu? ("what?")		

== Numerals ==
The Laz numerals are near identical to their Megrelian equivalents with minor phonetic differences. The number system is vigesimal like in Georgian.

=== Cardinal numbers ===
Almost all basic Laz cardinal numbers stem from the Proto-Kartvelian language, except ar(t) (one) and eči (twenty), which are reconstructed only for the Karto-Zan chronological level, having regular phonetical reflexes in Zan (Megrelo-Laz) and Georgian. The numeral šilya (thousand) is a Pontic Greek loanword and is more commonly used than original Laz vitoši.

==== Laz cardinal numbers compared to Megrelian, Georgian and Svan ====
	Laz	Megrelian	Georgian	Svan
1	ar(t)	arti	erti	ešxu
2	jur/cur	žiri/žəri	ori	yori
3	sum	sumi	sami	semi
4	otxo	otxi	otxi	oštxw
5	xut	xuti	xuti	woxušd
6	anşi	amšvi	ekvsi	usgwa
7	şkvit	škviti	švidi	išgwid
8	ovro	ruo	rva	ara
9	çxoro	čxoro	cxra	čxara
10	vit	viti	ati	ešd
11	vitoar	vitaarti	tertmeṭi	ešdešxu
12	vitojur	vitožiri	tormeṭi	ešdori
13	vitosum	vitosumi	cameṭi	ešdsemi
14	vitotxo	vitaantxi	totxmeṭi	ešdoštx
15	vitoxut	vitoxuti	txutmeṭi	ešdoxušd
20	eçi	eči	oci	yerwešd
21	eçidoar	ečdoarti	ocdaerti	yerwešdiešxu
30	eçidovit	ečdoviti	ocdaati	semešd
40	jurneçi	žaarneči	ormoci	woštxuešd
50	jurneçidovit	žaarnečdoviti	ormocdaati	woxušdešd
60	sumeneçi	sumoneči	samoci	usgwašd
70	sumeneçidovit	sumonečdoviti	samocdaati	išgvidašd
80	otxoneçi	otxoneči	otxmoci	arašd
90	otxoneçidovit	otxonečdoviti	otxmocdaati	chxarašd
100	oşi	oši	asi	ašir
101	oşi do ar	ošarti	aserti	ašir i ešxu
102	oşi do jur	ošžiri	asori	ašir i yori
110	oşi do vit	ošviti	asati	ašir i ešd
200	juroşi	žiroši	orasi	yori ašir
500	xutoşi	xutoši	xutasi	woxušd aršir
1000	şilya/vitoşi	antasi	atasi	atas
1999	şilya çxoroş otxoneçdovit̆oçxoro	antas čxoroš otxonečdovitočxoro	atas cxraas otxmocdacxrameṭi	atas čxara ašir chxarašd chxara
2000	jurşilya	žiri antasi	ori atasi	yori atas
10000	vit şilya	viti antasi	ati atasi	ešd atas

=== Ordinal numbers ===
Ordinal numbers in Laz are produced with the circumfix ma-...-a, which, in contrast with Megrelian, may be extended with suffix -n. The circumfix ma-...-a originates from Proto-Kartvelian and has regular phonetical equivalents in Georgian (me-...-e) and Svan (me-...-e)

==== Ordinal numbers' derivation rule ====
Laz	Megrelian	Georgian	Svan
ma-NUMBER-a(ni)	ma-NUMBER-a	me-NUMBER-e	me-NUMBER-e

==== Laz ordinal numbers compared to Megrelian, Georgian and Svan ====
	Laz	Megrelian	Georgian	Svan
1st	maartani	ṗirveli	ṗirveli	manḳwi
2nd	majura(ni)	mažira	meore	merme
3rd	masuma(ni)	masuma	mesame	meseme
4th	maotxa(ni)	maotxa/mantxa	meotxe	meuštxwe
5th	maxuta(ni)	maxuta	mexute	meuxušde
6th	maanşa(ni)	maamšva	meekvse	meusgwe
7th	maşkvita(ni)	maškvita	mešvide	meyšgwide
8th	maovra(ni)	maruo	merve	meare
9th	maçxora(ni)	mačxora	mecxre	meyčxre
10th	mavita(ni)	mavita	meate	meyšde
11th	mavitoarta(ni)	mavitaarta	metertmeṭe	meyšdešxue
12th	mavitojura(ni)	mavitožira	metormeṭe	meyšdore
13th	mavitosuma(ni)	mavitosuma	mecameṭe	meyšdseme
14th	mavitotxa(ni)	mavitaantxa	metotxmeṭe	meyšdoštxe
15th	mavitoxuta(ni)	mavitoxuta	metxutmeṭe	meyšdoxušde
20th	maeça(ni)	maeča	meoce	meyerwešde
21st	eçidomaarta(ni)	ečdomaarta	ocdameerte	
30th	ečidomavita(ni)	ečdomavita	ocdameate	mesemešde
40th	majurneça(ni)	mažaarneča	meormoce	meuštxuešde
50th	jurneçidomavita(ni)	žaarnečdomavita	ormocdameate	meuxušdešde
60th	masumeneça(ni)	masumoneča	mesamoce	meusgwešde
70th	sumeneçidomavita(ni)	sumonečdomavita	samocdameate	meyšgwidešde
80th	maotxoneça(ni)	maotxoneča	meotxmoce	mearašde
90th	otxoneçidomavita(ni)	otxonečdomavita	otxmocdameate	mečxarašde
100th	maoşa(ni)	maoša	mease	meašire
101st	oşmaarta(ni)	ošmaarta	asmeerte	
102nd	oşmajura(ni)	ošmažira	asmeore	
110th	oşmavita(ni)	ošmavita	asmeate	
200th	majuroşa(ni)	mažiroša	meorase	meyorašire
500th	maxutoşa(ni)	maxutoša	mexutase	meuxušdašire
1000th	maşilya(ni)/mavitoşa(ni)	maantasa	meatase	meatase

=== Fractional numbers ===
The fractional numbers' derivation rule in Laz and Megrelian is akin to Old Georgian and Svan.

==== Fractional numbers' derivation rule ====
Laz	Megrelian	Georgian		Svan
Laz	Megrelian	Old	New	Svan
na-NUMBER-al/or	na-NUMBER-al/or	na-NUMBER-al	me-NUMBER-ed	na-NUMBER-al/ul

==== Laz fractional numbers compared to Megrelian, Georgian and Svan ====
	Laz	Megrelian	Georgian		Svan
	Laz	Megrelian	Old	New	Svan
whole	mteli	teli	mrteli	mteli	tel
half	gverdi	gverdi	naxevari	naxevari	xənsga
1/3	nasumori	nasumori	nasamali	mesamedi	nasemal
1/4	naotxali	naotxali/naantxali	naotxali	meotxedi	naoštxul
1/5	naxutali	naxutali	naxutali	mexutedi	naxušdal
1/6	naanşali	naamšvali	naekvsali	meekvsedi	nausgwul
1/7	naşkvitali	naškvitali	našvidali	mešvidedi	nayšgwidal
1/8	naovrali	naruali	narvali	mervedi	naaral
1/9	naçxorali	načxorali	nacxrali	mecxredi	načxaral
1/10	navitali	navitali	naatali	meatedi	naešdal
1/11	navitoartali	navitaartali	natertmeṭali	metertmeṭedi	naešdešxul
1/12	navitojurali	navitožirali	natormeṭali	metormeṭedi	naešdoral
1/20	naeçali	naečali	naocali	meocedi	nayerwešdal
1/100	naoşali	naošali	naasali	measedi	naaširal
1/1000	naşilyali/navitoşali	naantasali	naatasali	meatasedi	naatasal

== Pronouns ==
=== Personal pronouns ===
	Laz			Megrelian	Georgian
	Khopa-Chkhala	Vitze-Arkabe	Atina-Artasheni	Megrelian	Georgian
I	ma(n)	ma	ma	ma	me
You (sing.)	si(n)	si	si	si	šen
That (close to speaker)	aya	haya	ham	ena	esa
This	ia	heya	him	ina	isa
We	çki	çku	şǩu	čki/čkə	čven
You (pl.)	tkvan	tkvan	t̆ǩva	tkva	tkven
Those	antepe	hamtepe	hani	enepi	eseni
These	entepe	hemtepe	hini	inepi	isini

=== Possessive pronouns ===
	Laz			Megrelian	Georgian
	Khopa-Chkhala	Vitze-Arkabe	Atina-Artasheni	Megrelian	Georgian
My	çkimi	çkimi	şǩimi	čkimi/čkəmi	čemi
Your (sing.)	skani	skani	sǩani	skani	šeni
His/her/its	muşi	muşi	himuşi	muši	misi
Our	çkini	çkuni	şǩuni	čkini/čkəni	čveni
Your (pl.)	tkvani	tkvani	t̆ǩvani	tkvani	tkveni
Their	mutepeşi	hemtepeşi	nişi	inepiš	mati

== Verbs ==
Laz verbs are inflected for seven categories: person, number, version, tense, mood, aspect and voice.

=== Person and Number ===
In Laz, like Mingrelian, Georgian, and Svan, verbs can be unipersonal, bipersonal, and tripersonal.

- Monovalent verbs have only subjective person and are intransitive.
- Bivalent verbs have one subject and one object (direct or indirect). They are:
  - transitive if the object is direct
  - intransitive if the object is indirect
- Trivalent verbs have one subject and two objects (one direct and the other indirect) and are ditransitive.

Verb personality table
	Unipersonal	Bipersonal		Tripersonal
	intransitive	transitive	intransitive	ditransitive
Subject	+	+	+	+
Direct Object	N/A	+	N/A	+
Indirect Object	N/A	N/A	+	+

The person may be singular or plural.

Subject and object markers in Laz are the same as in Mingrelian.

==== Subject markers ====
	Singular	Plural
S1	v-	v-...-t
S2	∅-	∅-...-t
S3	∅-...-n/-s/-u	∅-...-an/-es

==== Object markers ====
	Singular	Plural
O1	m-	m-...-an/-es/-t
O2	g-	g-...-an/-es/-t
O3	∅-	∅-...-an/-es

In pre-consonant position, the markers v- and g- change phonetically:

- Before voiced consonants: v- → b-
- Before voiceless (nonglottalized) consonants:
  - v- → b- → p-
  - g- → k-
- Before glottalized consonants:
  - v- → b- → p̌-
  - g- → ǩ-

=== Version ===
Like Megrelian, Georgian and Svan, Laz has four types of version marking:

- subjective – shows that the action is intended for oneself,
- objective – action is intended for another person,
- objective-passive – the action is intended for another person and at the same time indicating the passiveness of subject,
- neutral – neutral with respect to intention.

==== Laz version markers compared to Megrelian, Georgian and Svan ====
Version	Laz	Megrelian	Georgian	Svan
Subjective	-i-	-i-	-i-	-i-
Objective	-u-	-u-	-u-	-o-
Objective-passive	-a-	-a-	-e-	-e-
Neutral	-o-	-o-/-a-	-a-	-a-

=== Tenses ===
The maximum number of screeves in Laz is 22. They are grouped in three series. Two screeves (future I and past of future I) exist only for the verb r-, which serves as a 1st series root for oqopumu/ovapu/oyapu (to be).

==== Paradigm of verb conjugation ====
stems: ç̌ar- (to write) and r- (to be: just for future I and past of future I)

I Series
	Khopa-Chkhala	Vitze-Arkabe	Atina-Artasheni
present	ç̌arups	ç̌arums	
imperfect	ç̌arupt̆u	ç̌arumt̆u	
imperfective optative	ç̌arupt̆as	ç̌arumt̆as	
imperfective inferential	ç̌arupt̆-eren	ç̌arumt̆u-doren	ç̌arumt̆u-donu
present conditional	ç̌arupt̆u-ǩon	ç̌arumt̆u-ǩo(n)	
future I	(r)t̆as-unon	(r)t̆asen	ort̆as-en
past of future I	(r)t̆as-unt̆u	t̆ast̆u	ort̆as-eret̆u
II Series
	Khopa-Chkhala	Vitze-Arkabe	Atina-Artasheni
aorist	ç̌aru		
aoristic optative	ç̌aras		
aoristic inferential I	ç̌ar-eleren /ç̌ar-een /ç̌ar-elen	ç̌aru-doren	ç̌aru-donu
aoristic inferential II	ç̌ar-eleret̆u /ç̌ar-eet̆u /ç̌ar-elet̆u	ç̌aru-dort̆u	
aoristic inferential optative	ç̌ar-eleret̆as /ç̌ar-eet̆as /ç̌ar-elet̆as	n/a	
aoristic conditional	ç̌aru-ǩon		
future II	ç̌aras-unon	ç̌aras-en	
past of future II	ç̌aras-unt̆u /ç̌ara-t̆u	ç̌ara-t̆u	ç̌aras-ert̆u
conditional of aoristic inferential II	ç̌ar-eleret̆u-ǩon /ç̌ar-eet̆u-ǩon	n/a	
inferential of the past of future II	ç̌aras-unt̆-eren	ç̌ara-t̆u-doren	n/a
conditional of the past of future II	ç̌ara-t̆u-ǩon		n/a
III Series
	Khopa-Chkhala	Vitze-Arkabe	Atina-Artasheni
inversive inferential I	uç̌arun		
inversive inferential II	uç̌arut̆u		
inferential optative	uç̌arut̆as		
inferential conditional	uç̌arut̆u-ǩo(n)		

According to oldness these screeves can be grouped in two sets:

- old (primary) (common with Megrelian).
- new (secondary) derived from the basic screeves (specific Laz).

Classification of screeves according to oldness

Old (common with Megrelian)	New (specific Laz)
present	imperfective inferential
imperfect	future I
imperfective optative	past of future I
present conditional	aoristic inferential I
aorist	aoristic inferential II
aoristic optative	aoristic inferential optative
aoristic conditional	future II
inversive inferential I	past of future II
inversive inferential II	Conditional of aoristic inferential II
inferential optative	inferential of the past of future II
inferential conditional	conditional of the past of future II

=== Mood ===
==== Indicative ====
Indicative statement claims that the proposition should be taken as an apparent fact.

==== Interrogative ====
There are two ways to transform an indicative statement into a question:

- by means of interrogative words. E.g. mi? (who?), mu? (what?), so? (where?), mundes? (when?), muç̌o? (how?) etc. This rule is valid for Megrelian, Georgian and Svan as well.
- by adding an interrogative particle -i to the end of a verb. It has the same function as Megrelian -o, Old Georgian -a and Svan -ma/-mo/-mu.

==== Imperative ====
Indicates a command or request. The aorist form is used when addressing 2nd person (singular/plural) and aoristic optative in all other cases.

==== Subjunctive ====
Expresses possibility, wish, desire.

==== Conditional ====
Indicates condition in contrary to a fact. For this reason a verbal suffix -ǩo (At.-Arsh, Vtz.-Ark.) / -ǩon/-ǩoni (Khop.-Chkh.) is used.

== See also ==
=== References ===
- Chikobava, Arn. (1936). Grammatical analysis of Laz with texts (in Georgian). Tiflis.
- Chikobava, Arn. (1938). Chan-Megrel-Georgian Comparative Dictionary (in Georgian). Tbilisi.
- Fähnrich, H. & Sardzhveladze, Z. (2000). Etymological Dictionary of the Kartvelian Languages (in Georgian). Tbilisi.
- Kajaia, O. (2001–2002). Megrelian-Georgian dictionary. 3 Vols. (in Georgian). Tbilisi.
- Kartozia, G. (2005). The Laz language and its place in the system of Kartvelian languages (in Georgian). Tbilisi.
- Klimov, G. (1964). Etymological Dictionary of the Kartvelian Languages (in Russian). Moscow.
- Klimov, G. (1998). Etymological Dictionary of the Kartvelian Languages. Berlin: Mouton de Gruyter.
- Klimov, G. (1998). Languages of the World: Caucasian languages (in Russian). Moscow: Academia.
- Marr, N. (1910). Grammar of Chan (Laz) with reader and wordlist (in Russian). St. Petersburg..
- Qipshidze, I. (1911). Additional information about Chan (in Russian). St. Petersburg.
- Qipshidze, I. (1914). The Grammar of Mingrelian (Iver) Language with reader and dictionary (in Russian). St. Petersburg..
- Shanidze, A. (1973). Essentials of Georgian Grammar (in Georgian). Tbilisi.
- Topuria, V. & Kaldani, M. (2000). Svan Dictionary (in Georgian). Tbilisi.
