= Kurrama language =

Australian Aboriginal language

Kurrama
- Native to: Australia
- Region: Pilbara region of Western Australia, particularly around the Fortescue valley east of Millstream and south of the Fortescue River to Rocklea Station.
- Ethnicity: Kurrama, Jadira
- Native speakers: 10 (2005)
- Language family: Pama–Nyungan: Ngayarda; Yinjibarndi; Kurrama
- Dialects: Yinyjiwarnti; Yarnarri; Mijarranypa; Marntartka; Ngamangamara

Language codes
- ISO 639-3: vku
- Glottolog: kurr1243
- AIATSIS: W36
- ELP: Kurrama
- Kurrama is classified as CriticallyEndangered by the UNESCO Atlas of the World's Languages in Danger.

Kurrama is an Australian Aboriginal language. It is a dialect of Yindjibarndi, one of the Ngayarda languages of the large Pama–Nyungan family, with almost identical vocabulary and grammar, but speakers consider it to be a distinct language.

The language name has also previously been written as: Kurama, Gurrama, Gurama (amongst others). While there is no official orthography for Kurrama the Wangka Maya Pilbara Aboriginal Language Centre uses the spelling "Kurrama" in all its publications.

A number of linguists have carried out work on Kurrama however there is not yet a comprehensive grammatical description of the language. The Pilbara Aboriginal Language Centre has an ongoing program of documentation of Pilbara languages, including Kurrama.

The Kurrama people associated with the language are an indigenous Australian group whose traditional lands are centred on the higher plateau regions of the Hamersley Ranges.

== Phonology ==
=== Consonants ===
| | Peripheral | | Laminal | | Apical | |
| | Bilabial | Velar | Palatal | Dental | Alveolar | Retroflex |
|---|---|---|---|---|---|---|
| Plosive | p | k | c | t̪ | t | ʈ |
| Nasal | m | ŋ | ɲ | n̪ | n | ɳ |
| Rhotic | | | | | ɾ ~ r | |
| Lateral | | | ʎ | l̪ | l | ɭ |
| Approximant | w | | j | j̪ | | ɻ |

=== Vowels ===
| | Front | Central | Back |
|---|---|---|---|
| High | i, iː | | u, uː |
| Low | | a, aː | |
