= Yinhawangka language =

Extinct language of Western Australia

Yinhawangka
- Ngarla
- Native to: Western Australia
- Region: Pilbara
- Ethnicity: Inawongga, Ninanu, Ngarlawangga (Ngarla)
- Extinct: (date missing); 12 self-reported (2021 census)
- Language family: Pama–Nyungan: Ngayarda; Yinhawangka

Language codes
- ISO 639-3: ywg
- Glottolog: yinh1234
- AIATSIS: A48
- ELP: Yinhawangka

Yinhawangka (Inawangga) is a Pama–Nyungan language of Western Australia. Dench (1995) believed there was insufficient data to enable it to be confidently classified, but Bowern & Koch (2004) include it among the Ngayarda languages without proviso.

== Phonology ==
=== Consonants ===
Consonant phonemes
	Peripheral		Laminal		Apical	
	Bilabial	Velar	Palatal	Dental	Alveolar	Retroflex
Plosive	p	k	ɟ	t̪	t	ʈ
Nasal	m	ŋ	ɲ	n̪	n	ɳ
Lateral			ʎ	l̪	l	ɭ
Rhotic					ɾ	
Approximant	w		j			ɻ

=== Vowels ===
Vowel phonemes
	Front	Central	Back
High	i, iː		u, uː
Low	a, aː		

== See also ==
- Ngarla language
