= Yinjibarndi language =

Australian Aboriginal language

Yinjibarndi
- Burnugundi, Mandanjingu
- Native to: Australia
- Region: Roebourne region of Western Australia
- Ethnicity: Yindjibarndi
- Native speakers: 380 (2021 census)
- Language family: Pama–Nyungan: Ngayarda; Yinjibarndi
- Dialects: Kurrama

Language codes
- ISO 639-3: yij
- Glottolog: yind1247
- AIATSIS: W37
- ELP: Yindjibarndi

Yinjibarndi is a Pama–Nyungan language spoken by the Yindjibarndi people of the Pilbara region in north-western Australia.

Yinjibarndi is mutually intelligible with Kurrama, but the two are considered distinct languages by their speakers.

== Classification ==
Yindjibarndi is classified as a member of the Ngayarta branch of the Pama–Nyungan languages. Under Carl Georg von Brandenstein's 1967 classification, Yindjibarndi was classed as an Inland Ngayarda language, but the separation of the Ngayarda languages into Coastal and Inland groups is no longer considered valid.

== Phonology ==
Consonant phonemes
	Peripheral		Laminal		Apical	
	Bilabial	Velar	Palatal	Dental	Alveolar	Retroflex
Plosive	p	k	c	t̪	t	ʈ
Nasal	m	ŋ	ɲ	n̪	n	ɳ
Rhotic					ɾ ~ r	
Lateral					l	ɭ
Approximant	w		j	j̪		ɻ

Vowel inventory
	Front	Central	Back
High	i, iː		u, uː
Low		a, aː	oː

== Grammar ==
=== Pronouns ===
Yindjibarndi, like Lardil, has pronouns that indicate whether the referents include two people separated by an odd number of generations or not.

== Influence on other languages ==
The English verb yandy, meaning 'to separate (grain or pieces of mineral) by shaking in a special shallow dish', comes from Yindjibarndi.
