= Jadira =

Jadira refers to a people and territory believed by Norman Tindale to inhabit an area in the Pilbara region of Western Australia. The status of Jadira in the sense defined by Tindale has been recently questioned by Paul Burke.

== Ascribed country ==
Tindale described the tribal boundaries of some 3,600 square miles (9,300 km^{2}) of land belonging to this "Jadira" people, in the following terms.3,600 sq. The Jadira occupied the areas about the middle sections of the Cane and Robe rivers, running south of Mount Minnie, and as far north as the Fortescue River. Their eastern frontier putatively fell short of the western scarp of the higher plateau of the Hamersley Ranges.

Tindale also added a list of alternative names for these Jadira:

- Kawarindjari, Kawarandjari
- Kawarandari
- Kawarindjara
- Kauarind'arri, Kauarndhari
- Garindjari

These terms represented Ngarluma exonyms applied to the Jadira, and bore the sense of "belonging to the west".

The only other information available to Tindale led him to suggest that some of the Jadira, a non-circumcising tribe, with the onset of European colonization, shifted eastwards to Ashburton Downs Station, while a second group moved to the mouth of the Fortescue River where they were assimilated into the Martuthinira. Traditionally, he added, their access to the coastal waters lay through Nhuwala (which Tindale spelt Noala) territory, between the Cane and Robe rivers, a practice Tindale described as "trespassing".

== Controversy ==
Aboriginal Legal Aid lawyer and Land Council lawyer Paul Burke re-examined Tindale's papers and sources when, with regard to a native title claim, he had to work out the precise boundaries for another tribe in this area. He came to the conclusion that the Jadira people and their territory were a misnomer, a phantom category, inexplicably created by Tindale on otherwise very thin evidence.

The primary source for Tindale's thesis lies in a single reference to the Kau'arndhäri (Note: Bates spells it two slightly different ways: "Kau'arndhäri", and "Kauarndhari".) in a 1914 paper by Daisy Bates, where Bates names it as one of four western Pilbara tribes – the others being the Ngarluma, the Kariera, and the Martuthinira – whose class system, governing marriages, is, she claimed, identical. (Note: Bates does however distinguish between cross-cousin marriage permitted by the Kariera and Ngarluma, but not by the Martuthinira or Kau'arndhäri, a statement which contradicts her prior remark that she did not have sufficient information on the last two regarding cross-cousin rules.) Bates does not mention the Jadira, but Tindale drew the conclusion that it was the endonym of the Kau'arndhäri, on the basis of a report by Carl Georg von Brandenstein, the first person to introduce the term 'Jadira,' and who glossed the latter term (Kau'arndhäri) by the former.

== Sources ==
- "AIATSIS map of Indigenous Australia". AIATSIS. 14 May 2024.
- "Tindale Tribal Boundaries" (PDF). Department of Aboriginal Affairs, Western Australia. September 2016. Archived from the original (PDF) on 8 March 2016.
- Bates, D. M. (1914). "Social Organisation of some Western Australian tribes". Reports of the Australia and New Zealand Association for the Advancement of Science. 14: 387–400.
- Burke, Paul (December 2015). Roberts, Amy; McCaul, Kim (eds.). "Cartographic Ethnogenesis: Tindale's Invention of the Jadira Tribe in the Pilbara Region of Western Australia" (PDF). Journal of the Anthropological Society of South Australia. 39 (Special Edition: Norman B. Tindale's Research Legacy and the Cultural Heritage of Indigenous Australians): 102–126. Archived from the original (PDF) on 1 September 2017.
- Tindale, Norman Barnett (1974). "Jadira (WA)". Aboriginal Tribes of Australia: Their Terrain, Environmental Controls, Distribution, Limits, and Proper Names. Australian National University. Archived from the original on 20 March 2020.
