= Nhuwala =

Indigenous Australian people of Western Australia

The Nhuwala are an Aboriginal Australian people of the Pilbara region of Western Australia.

== Language ==
Where Nhuwala fits into the classification of Australian Aboriginal languages has not yet been ascertained with absolute certainty due to lack of data, though the working assumption is that it belongs to the Ngayarta family.

== Country ==
According to Norman Tindale, the Nhuwala tribal lands covered an estimated 5,700 square kilometres (2,200 sq mi), approximately along the coastal plain, and extending inland some 64 kilometres (40 mi), from the vicinity of Cape Preston, close to the area where the Fortescue River flows into the Indian Ocean, southwest from Onslow. The hinterland reaches stopped short of the Thalanyji territory at the Ashburton River.

== Alternative names ==
- Nuala
- Ngoala
- Noella
- Noanamaronga (Mardudunera exonym)
- Jawanmala (Yindjibarndi exonym, meaning "people downstream")
- Nunkaberi

== Sources ==
- "AIATSIS map of Indigenous Australia". AIATSIS. 10 November 2022.
- "Tindale Tribal Boundaries" (PDF). Department of Aboriginal Affairs, Western Australia. September 2016. Archived from the original (PDF) on 2016-03-08.
- Dench, Alan Charles (1987). Martuthunira: a language of the Pilbara region of Western Australia (PDF) (Doctoral thesis). Australian National University.
- Koch, Harold (2004). "A methodological history of Australian linguistic classification". In Bowern, Claire; Koch, Harold (eds.). Australian Languages: Classification and the Comparative Method. John Benjamins Publishing. pp. 17–59. ISBN 9789027247612.
- Tindale, Norman Barnett (1974). "Noala (WA)". Aboriginal Tribes of Australia: Their Terrain, Environmental Controls, Distribution, Limits, and Proper Names. Australian National University. Archived from the original on 20 March 2020.
