= Cape Preston =

Headland in Western Australia

Coordinates: 20°51′0″S 116°12′0″E

Cape Preston is a rocky headland located in the Pilbara region of Western Australia, situated 67 km (42 mi) West South West of Karratha. It lies on the tribal land of the indigenous Nhuwala.

Cape Preston is a standard Bureau of Meteorology reference point for coastal weather reports, it is located between Wallal and North West Cape.

The area is noted for its rich marine biodiversity and contains a large number of species of crustaceans, corals, molluscs, fish and echinoderms. A number of habitats suitable for sustaining exist around the cape including mangroves, sandy beaches, algal meadows, coral reefs, rocky reefs and soft sediment communities.

In 1889, a pearl lugger was seen sinking off Cape Preston. Its name was variously reported as the Waratah or Paratch from Fremantle, belonging to James Clarke. It was witnessed by the crew of the lugger Mikado and it was later confirmed that all hands were lost.

On 23 April 1989, the category four Tropical Cyclone Orson hit the cape, killing four Indonesian fisherman.

During the mid-late 1960s, Cape Preston was considered as a possible location for an iron ore outport. A similar plan was ultimately realised in 2012, and iron ore exports commenced in 2013.

== Sino Iron Project ==
Resources company Austeel was granted permission to build an iron ore operation in the area in 2003 following environmental approval being given by then minister Judy Edwards. Construction of the operation was to commence in late 2004.

A contract was awarded to develop the mine to a Chinese state-owned company, China Metallurgical Group Corp, in 2007. The project was estimated to cost $1.98 billion, including a magnetite mine, a seawater desalination plant, a thermal power plant and port facilities.

Between 2007 and 2011, a seawater desalination plant was built to provide water for the mining project, then known as the Sino Iron Project. Its daily production capacity is 140 megalitres, or 51 gigalitres annually. Waste brine is returned to the sea via a 3 km pipeline.

The project started producing magnetite concentrate in late 2012 and the first shipment was exported to China in 2013.

As of 2016, the project is owned by Chinese state-owned Hong Kong-based CITIC Limited and according to the company represents "one of China's largest investments into the Australian resources sector".

On 15 July 2017 the private Cape Preston – Sino Iron Aerodrome [YCPR] was opened. About a dozen flights land each week. Nominally aimed at fly-in fly-out travel for company staff, it has drawn criticism from the United Australia Party for its possible strategic uses.

== See also ==
Coastal regions of Western Australia

- Port Darwin
- Port of Newcastle
