= Screeve =

Georgian grammar system

Mts'k'rivi (Georgian: მწკრივი [mt͡sʼkʼrivi]; 'row'), also known as screeve, is a term of grammatical description in traditional Georgian grammar that roughly corresponds to tense–aspect–mood marking in the Western grammatical tradition.

== Grammar ==
Formally, it refers to a set of six verb forms inflected for person and number forming a single paradigm. For example, the aorist screeve for most verbal forms consists at least of a preverb (და- da- 'PFV'), a root (წერ ts’er 'write'), and a screeve ending (-ე -e, -ა -a, -ეს -es), and in the first and second persons a plural suffix (-თ -t) to form the inflection (დაწერეთ dats'eret):

	Singular	Plural
1st person	დავწერე davts’ere 'I wrote it'	დავწერეთ davts'eret 'We wrote it'
2nd person	დაწერე dats’ere 'You (singular) wrote it'	დაწერეთ dats’eret 'You (plural) wrote it'
3rd person	დაწერა dats’era 'He/she wrote it'	დაწერეს dats’eres 'They wrote it'

Similar constructions exist in Western grammars, but screeves differ from them in significant ways. In many Western languages, endings encode all of tense, aspect and mood, but in Georgian, the screeve endings may or may not include one of these categories. For example, the perfect series screeves have modal and evidential properties that are completely absent in the aorist and present/future series screeves, such that წერილი დაუწერია ts’erili dauts’eria 'He has apparently written the letter' implies that the speaker knows the letter is written because (for example) they have seen the finished letter sitting on a table. However, the present form წერილს დაწერს ts’erils dats’ers 'He will write the letter' is simply neutral with respect to the question of how the speaker knows (or does not know) that the letter will be written.

== See also ==
- Georgian verb paradigm
- Grammatical conjugation

== Bibliography ==
- Aronson, Howard I. (1990). Georgian : a reading grammar (Corrected ed.). Columbus, OH: Slavica Publishers. ISBN 9780893572075. OCLC 21970517.
- Mantovani, Luigi (1997) Piccola grammatica della lingua georgiana, Urban Publ. ISBN 978-88-86205-39-9
