= Ngarla language =

Aboriginal language of Western Australia

Ngarla
- Native to: Port Hedland area of Western Australia
- Ethnicity: Ngarla
- Native speakers: Critically endangered
- Language family: Pama–Nyungan: Ngayarda; Ngarla

Language codes
- ISO 639-3: nrk
- Glottolog: ngar1296
- AIATSIS: A48
- ELP: Ngarla
- Ngarla is classified as Extinct by the UNESCO Atlas of the World's Languages in Danger.

Ngarla is a Pama–Nyungan language of coastal Western Australia. It is possibly mutually intelligible with Panyjima and Martuthunira, but the three are considered distinct languages.

Ngarla is a member of the Ngayarda branch of the Pama–Nyungan languages. Dench (1995) believed there was insufficient data to enable it to be confidently classified, but Bowern & Koch (2004) include it without proviso.

Ngarla is spoken near Port Hedland. The "Ngarla" on the Ashburton River is a dialect of a different, though possibly related, language, Yinhawangka.

According to the Irra Wangga Language Centre, "Ngarla is no longer spoken today, although there remain some community members who know some words and phrases in the language".

== Phonology ==
=== Consonants ===
	Labial	Dorso-velar	Lamino-palatal	Apico-alveolar	Retroflex
Nasal	m	ŋ	ɲ	n	ɳ
Stop	p	k	c	t	ʈ
Lateral			ʎ	l	ɭ
Rhotic				ɾ	ɽ
Semivowel	w		j		

=== Vowels ===
	Front	Back
High	i iː	u uː
Low	a aː	

The long vowels are rare.

== Grammar ==
=== Tense markers ===
Ngarla tense markers for verbs:

Tense marker	Tense
-n	past
-ngkaya	present
-kuRa	future

== Language revival ==
As of 2020, Ngarla is one of 20 languages prioritised as part of the Priority Languages Support Project, being undertaken by First Languages Australia and funded by the Department of Communications and the Arts. The project aims to "identify and document critically-endangered languages—those languages for which little or no documentation exists, where no recordings have previously been made, but where there are living speakers".

Research has been undertaken on the language at the Irra Wangga Language Centre, who have produced resources in Ngarla, including Ngarla Numbers and Jamie’s Bush Tucker Trip.
