= Polypersonal agreement =

Grammatical feature of certain languages

In linguistics, polypersonal agreement or polypersonalism is the agreement of a verb with more than one of its arguments (usually up to four). Polypersonalism is a morphological feature of a language, and languages that display it are called polypersonal languages.

In non-polypersonal languages, the verb either shows no agreement at all or agrees with the primary argument (in English, the subject). In a language with polypersonal agreement, the verb has agreement morphemes that may indicate (as applicable) the subject, the direct object, the indirect or secondary object, the beneficiary of the verb action, etc. This polypersonal marking may be compulsory or optional (the latter meaning that some agreement morphemes can be elided if the full argument is expressed).

Polysynthesis often includes polypersonalism, which in turn is a form of head-marking. Polypersonalism has also been correlated with ergativity.

Examples of languages with polypersonal agreement are the Bantu languages, Basque, Georgian, Hadza, Magahi, to a lesser extent Hungarian (see definite conjugation), as well as most polysynthetic languages, like Mohawk, Inuktitut and many other Native American and Australian languages.

== Examples ==
=== Georgian ===
In Georgian, the verb consists of a root and several optional affixes. The subject and object markers might appear as suffixes or prefixes, according to the verb class, the person and number, the tense and aspect of the verb, etc.; they also interact with each other phonologically. The polypersonal verbal system of Georgian allows the verb compound to convey the meanings of subject, direct object, indirect object, genitive, locative and causative meanings. As examples of the extremely complicated Georgian verb morphology, these are some simple polypersonal verbs (hyphens indicate morpheme boundaries; person-marking morphemes are in bold):

ვხედავ v-khed-av 'I see him'
მხედავს m-khed-av-s 'he sees me'
მხედავთ m-khed-av-t 'you (pl.) see me'
მხედავ m-khed-av 'you (sg.) see me'
გმალავენ g-mal-av-en 'they hide you (sing. or pl.)'
გიმალავენ g-i-mal-av-en 'they hide it from you (sing. or pl.)'
გვიკეთებს gv-i-ket-eb-s 'he is doing it for us'
აჩუქებს a-chuk-eb-s 'he will give it to him (as a gift)'
მიულოცავს mi-u-lots-av-s 'he will congratulate him on it'
არბენინებენ a-rb-en-in-eb-en 'They are making him run'
გადმოგვახტუნებინებდით gad-mo-gv-a-xtun-eb-in-eb-di-t 'you would make us make him jump (towards us)'

An example of a polypersonal verb that has a possessive meaning incorporated can be:

ხელები გამიცივდა xelebi ga-m-i-tsiv-d-a 'My hands got cold'

Here, ხელები (xelebi) means 'hands'. The second morpheme in the verb (-m-) conveys the meaning 'my'. In Georgian this construction is very common with intransitive verbs; the possessive adjective (my, your, etc.) is omitted before the subject, and the verb takes up the possessive meaning.

=== Basque ===
Basque is a language isolate with a polypersonal verbal system comprising two sub-types of verbs, synthetic and analytical. The following three cases are cross-referenced on the verb: the absolutive (the case for the subject of intransitive verbs and the direct objects of transitive verbs), the ergative (the case for the subject of transitive verbs), and the dative (the case for the indirect object of a transitive verb). A dative (along with the absolutive) can also be cross-referenced on an intransitive verb without a direct object in a "dative of interest" type of construction (cf. English "My car broke down on me"), as well as in constructions involving intransitive verbs of perception or feeling. Synthetic verbs take affixes directly onto their stems, while analytical verbs use a non-finite form that carries the lexical meaning of the verb, along with a conjugated auxiliary which is either strictly transitive or intransitive. Some common auxiliaries used to conjugate analytical verbs are izan ‘be’, ukan ‘have’, and egin ‘do’.

Unlike Georgian, Basque has only a few really synthetic tenses able to take these affixes, and only a dozen of verbs use them: -present simple (Berandu zatoz, "You [polite, singular] are coming late") and past simple (Berandu zentozen, "You [polite, singular] were coming late"), in the indicative mood, -imperative (only in affirmative sentences: Zatoz bihar! means "Come tomorrow!", an order given to one person, which can also be given using its auxiliary —Etor zaitez bihar!—, but which requires it when giving a negative order —Ez zaitez bihar etor!—. and -conditional, both for possible future conditions (Bihar bazentoz, "If you came tomorrow") and possible future consequences (Aukera bazenu, bihar zentozke, "If you had the chance, you would come tomorrow". The conditional forms are very literary and uncommon in spoken Basque.

Here are a few examples:

Synthetic forms:

d- akar -ki -o -gu
3.ABS.PRS- bring:PRS -DAT_FLAG -3.DAT -1PL.ERG
‘We bring it to him/her’

z-erama-zki-gu-te-n ‘They took them to us’ from eraman ‘take’

Analytical or semi-synthetic forms:

Ekarriko d-i-o-gu ‘We'll bring it to him/her’
Eraman d-ieza-zki-gu-ke-te ‘They can take them to us’ (‘d…zki’ standing for ‘them’, ‘ieza’ being a form of the auxiliary ‘izan’, ‘gu’ standing for ‘to us’, ‘te’ for ‘they’, and ‘ke’ being a potential marker)
Iristen z-a-izki-zue ‘They get to you (pl)’ from iritsi ‘get, arrive’

=== Semitic languages ===
In Biblical Hebrew, or in poetic forms of Hebrew, a pronominal direct object can be incorporated into a verb's conjugation rather than included as a separate word. For example, ahavtikha, with the suffix -kha indicating a masculine, singular, second-person direct object, is a poetic way to say ahavti otkha ("I loved you"). This also changes the position of the stress; while ahavti puts the stress on hav (/a'hav.ti/), ahavtikha puts it on ti (/a.hav'ti.xa/).

The same is true also of Arabic and Akkadian. A number of modern Arabic dialects incorporate both direct and indirect object pronouns, e.g. Egyptian Arabic /ma-katab-hum-ˈliː-ʃ/ "he didn't write them to me". (In Classical Arabic the equivalent would be three words: /mā kataba-hum lī/, incorporating the direct object but not the indirect object.)

=== Ganda ===
In Ganda, direct and indirect pronominal objects may be incorporated into the verb as object infixes. For example:

n- ki- ku- wa
I.SUBJ- it.OBJ- you.OBJ- give
'I give it to you'

y- a- ki- n- gamb -ira
he.SUBJ- PAST- it.OBJ- me.OBJ- tell -APPL
'he told it to me'

In the second example, the applicative suffix -ira converts the (usually monotransitive) verb gamba to a ditransitive.

While agreement with a verbal subject is compulsory, agreement with an object is required only when the object is omitted. Many other Bantu languages exhibit this feature.

=== Guarani ===
In Guarani, verbs have two sets of person-marking prefixes: so called "active" and "inactive" prefixes. In transitive verbs, these prefixes encode the subject and direct object respectively, but cannot occur together. The rules for deciding which one to use are as follows:

- if the object is 3rd person, the subject marker is used;
- if the subject is 1st person exclusive (singular or plural) and the object is 2nd person (singular or plural), dedicated fusional prefixes that encode both elements are used;
- otherwise, the object marker is used.

Thus, most instances of agreement are made with only one actor (subject or object), but some cases do showcase polypersonality:

ai-nupá ichu-pe
1SG.SUB-beat him/her-ACC
'I beat him/her'

che-nupá ha'e
1SG.OBJ-beat s/he
's/he beat me'

Note that the verb form chenupá alone gives no explicit information on the subject, and could translate as "You/he/she/it/they beat me" depending on context.

ro-ha'aró-hína che-r-u
1>2SG-wait-PROG 1SG.POSS-father
'I was waiting for you (sg.), dad!'

a-je-gueraha po-juhu hagua
1SG.SUB-PASS-carry 1>2PL-find for
'I am/was brought to meet you (pl.)'

This system is often described as resulting from a personal hierarchy within pronominal markers: whichever marker places highest in a 1 > 2 > 3 personal hierarchy takes precedence over the other, whether it is a subject or object marker.

As an exception to this, the specific combination of a second person plural subject and a first person singular object can optionally be expressed as pe-che- (subject prefix+object prefix) instead of che- (bare object prefix):

aguyje-ta-ite pe-che-rendu-rehe
thanks-multitude-very 2PL.SUB-1SG.OBJ-listen-at
'Many thanks for (your pl.) listening to me.'

=== Hungarian ===
In Hungarian the suffix -lak or -lek indicates a first person singular subject and a second person (either singular or plural) object. The most prominent example is szeretlek "I love you". The second person singular object may be omitted but the plural requires the pronoun (titeket).

== Clitic pronouns ==
Polypersonalism involves bound morphemes that are part of the verbal morphology and therefore cannot be found separated from the verb. These morphemes are not to be confused with pronominal clitics.

Some have observed that the French pronominal clitics (common to all Romance languages) have evolved into inseparable parts of the verb in colloquial use, which suggests that French could be analyzed as polypersonal.

== See also ==
- Morphological typology
- Clitic doubling
- Incorporation
- Pro-drop language
