= Ngayarda languages =

Pama–Nyungan language group of Australia

Ngayarda
- Geographic distribution: Western Australia
- Linguistic classification: Pama–Nyungan: Southwest; Pilbara; Ngayarda

Language codes
- Glottolog: ngay1241
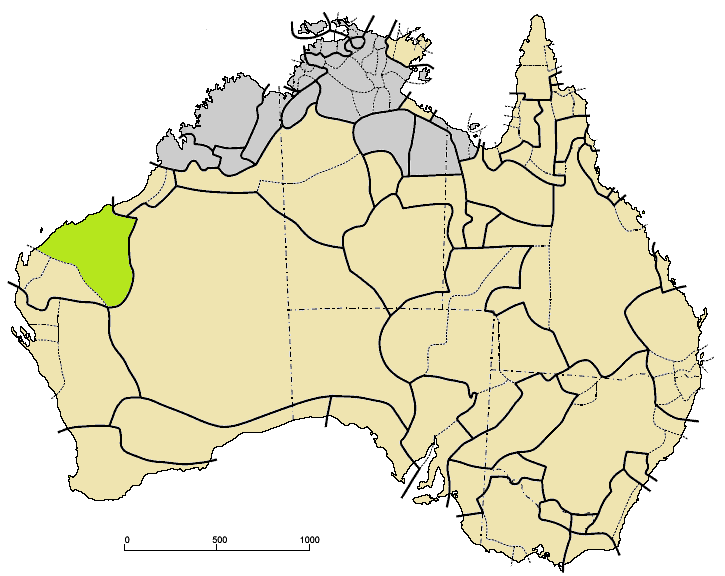
- Ngayarda languages (green) among other Pama–Nyungan (tan)

The Ngayarda (Ngayarta /ŋajaʈa/) languages are a group of closely related languages in the Pilbara region of Western Australia. The languages classified as members of the Ngayarda languages group are:

- Martuthunira
- Ngarluma-Kariyarra
- Yindjibarndi–Kurrama
- Panyjima
- Jurruru
- Nyamal
- Yinhawangka
- Ngarla
- Nhuwala
- Palyku

Linguist Alan Dench says that for Yinhawangka, Nhuwala and Ngarla there is insufficient data to enable them to be confidently classified, and he places them in Ngayarda for convenience. However, in the book Australian Languages: Classification and the Comparative Method, Claire Bowern and Harold James Koch include them without proviso. Further, there are grounds for considering Yindjibarndi-Kurrama and Ngarluma-Kariyarra to be dialect pairs, though the indigenous perception is that they are separate languages. Palyku has sometimes been excluded; it is somewhat divergent.

The name ngayarda comes from the word for "man" in many of the languages of the group. They form a branch of the Pama–Nyungan family.

The Ngayarda group is justified on the basis of lexicostatistics as well as the following grammatical features (first proposed by linguist Geoffrey O'Grady in 1966) as diagnostic of this group:

- The better-known members of the group (i.e. Ngarluma and Yindjibarndi) have a productive active/passive voice distinction.
- The reflex of Proto Pama-Nyungan *-lu~-ngku is not used as a marker of transitive subject
- The Proto Pama-Nyungan suffix *-ku has shifted from the specialised meaning indirect object to the broader meaning object
- The Proto Pama-Nyungan verb suffix *-(l)ku has shifted from future (or optative) to present

C.G. von Brandenstein devised a classification which divided this group into a Coastal Ngayarda and an Inland Ngayarda. This is no longer considered correct, however Austin points out that von Brandenstein's errors have been reproduced by Wurm and Hattori in their map of Australian languages, which appears to be based on the same classification.
