= Nhuwala language =

Australian Aboriginal language

Nhuwala
- Native to: Western Australia
- Region: Barrow and Monte Bello Islands and nearby coast
- Extinct: Late 1990s
- Language family: Pama–Nyungan: Ngayarda; Nhuwala

Language codes
- ISO 639-3: nhf
- Glottolog: nhuw1239
- AIATSIS: W30
- ELP: Nhuwala

Nhuwala is an extinct Pama–Nyungan language of Western Australia. Dench (1995) believed there was insufficient data to enable it to be confidently classified, but Bowern & Koch (2004) include it among the Ngayarda languages without proviso.

== Names ==
Alternate names for Nhuwala include Nuala, Ngoala, Noella, Noanamaronga, Nooanamaronga, Jawanmala, Nunkaberi and Noala.
