= Jacob Oberdoo =

(1920-1989) Aboriginal community leader)

Jacob Oberdoo, also known as Minyjun (c. 1920 - 27 October 1989) was a Nyangumarta man and an Aboriginal community leader. He is best remembered for his involvement in the Pilbara Strike, which took place between 1946 and 1949, in which he was a respected gang boss and various camps and a noted lawman. Following the strike he was an active member of the Pindan group (later Pindan Pty Ltd) and then Nomads Pty Ltd.

== Biography ==
Oberdoo was born at Christmas Pool, near the edge of what is now Karlamilyi National Park, in the Great Sandy Desert of Western Australia. He was the son of Pilikayi Likiya and Kajayingu and in the early 1930s, when Oberdoo was around ten years old, they moved onto cattle stations for the first time and lived first at Warrawagine Station and then at Mount Edgar Station. On these stations Pilikayi Likiya was employed to hunt kangaroos and Oberdoo, and his younger brother, began being training, and working as, stockmen for limited pay and rations.

On 1 May 1946 Oberdoo, and his family, joined the Pilbara strike and, as they were no longer able to live on the station (as they were not working), they relocated to Moolyella where a camp for strikers had been established. While living there he became of respected gang boss of numerous mining sites, leading workers there participating in the Pindan group, which aimed to provide money and resources for the strikers. He was also involved in larger gatherings of strikers who met, and arranged protests, in places such as Port Hedland and he was, at least twice, arrested for his involvement in these.

After the end of the strike Oberdoo continued with his involvement in the Pindan group and, with the creation of Pindan Pty Ltd in 1955, became one of the company directors and held 1,000 shares. In 1959, caused largely by a disagreement between Putangaja Ernie Mitchell and Don McLeod, the company split and Oberdoo remained loyal to McLeod alongside Dooley Bin Bin and a larger group of around 200 predominately Nyangumarta and Warnman people who he led. He felt that the other group, who were predominately Nyamal, held overly relaxed attitudes to their responsibilities under customary law and he also agreed with McLeod, that government intervention should be avoided as much as possible.

Following this split Oberdoo, and many of the group, relocated to Roebourne and, alongside McLeod, he formed Nomads Pty Ltd in 1960. In 1972 the Nomads bought and moved to Strelley Station, now known as Warralong Community. That same year he was offered a British Empire Medal to recognise the work he had done for his community, but he refused it saying:

You put medals on dogs. Our people don't have any land. They don't have any money and they haven't had much help from any government. They don't need medals.

— Jacob Oberdoo, The Canberra Times, 20 January 1972

Fellow Pilbara Strike leader Peter Coppin accepted the award.

At Strelley Oberdoo was instrumental to the establishment of the community school and the introduction of Nyangumarta and Manjiljarra language education projects. Additionally he was involved with the acquisition of further pastoral leases and the establishment of several outstation communities throughout these lands.

It was because of these land acquisitions that, on 25 December 1982, he was able to return to live on his Country and settled, alongside a small group, to Dunns Soak (Punmu). While living there he was one of the associate producers of documentary film How the West Was Lost (1987) by David Noakes which includes interviews with him.

He died at Punmu on 27 October 1989.

== Legacy ==
There is a portrait of Oberdoo, painted by Sam Fullbrook, held at the National Gallery of Australia.
