= Clancy McKenna =

(1909-1979) Aboriginal activist

Clancy McKenna, also known as Warntupungarna, (c. 24 September 1909 - 20 August 1979) was a Nyamal man and an Aboriginal activist who is best remembered for his involvement in the Pilbara strike which took place between 1946 and 1949.

== Biography ==
McKenna was born at Meentheena Station, nearby by Marble Bar, in Western Australia. He was the son of Maurice McKenna, the station manager and Nyamalangu (also known as Nellie). Nyamalangu was married to Frank Djungunbuna and, when McKenna was only about three years old, Maurice evicted the family from the station at gunpoint. After leaving Meenthenna the family lived and worked at various cattle stations in the Marble Bar area.

As a young man McKenna also started working on cattle stations and, soon after, became an itinerant contractor, travelling to find work building fences and sinking wells throughout the Pilbara Region. He also, at various points, worked as a gold miner and truck driver and, in each of these roles, his pay was still significantly below that of white workers doing the same work. In this work he was known to be 'outspoken' to his white bosses in regards to better conditions for himself and other Aboriginal workers in the region. In addition to this work McKenna was a Nyamal lawman and, additionally, had the skill to interpret Aboriginal culture to Europeans and, because of this, was once accused of being 'a whitefella today and a blackfella tomorrow'.

In the early 1940s he met Don McLeod, who was then also employed as a contractor, and they, alongside Dooley Bin Bin, began to plan for strike action. Together they sought a minimum wage of 30 shillings per week for all pastoral workers, regardless of their background. In encouraging the strike he spent many years travelling across the region and spreading the idea of the strike and this did not go unnoticed by the authorities, including the police, who on numerous occasions threatened to remove him from the district if he continued. In this period he said Jack McPhee, a fellow Nyamal stockman, that "sour bread and kangaroo, old tea and no pay, that's not right Jack. Striking is the only way, we don't want to be treated like dogs anymore".

The strike they planned became known as the Pilbara strike; it began on 1 May 1946 and lasted until 1949. As a part of the strike more than 800 workers from over a dozen pastoral stations stopped work until their demands were met. On 7 May 1946, within a week of the strike being declared, McKenna was arrested alongside Bin Bin and McLeod. He was convicted and sentenced to three months hard labour for 'enticing' Aboriginal people from their employment which, in the courts eye, was a breach of section 57 of the Native Administration Act 1936. Following national coverage and advocacy from a number of groups McKenna was released in June having not completed the full sentence.

To ensure that the striking workers had resources McKenna helped establish a co-operative to meet their needs and, to support themselves, they collected pearl shells, hunted kangaroos and feral goats for their skins and undertook some mining. Throughout this he continued to be directly involved in the strike action and led numerous marches.

In 1947 he was arrested again for preventing a group of 40 strikers returning to station work and, for this, he served two months in jail. Later in 1947 he left the strike movement and began working at Mundabullangana Station alongside Putangaja Ernie Mitchell and Peter Coppin who had formed the Nyamal mining co-operative which was Aboriginal owned and run. However, he left this soon after as he was unhappy with the organisational arrangement which did not pay wages to members.

Following the end of the strike McKenna, alongside McLeod, became a part of the 'Pindan mob', another co-operative, which took part in mining activities while supplementing his income as a contractor. Pindan split in 1960 and McKenna separated himself from McLeod.

Some time later, he moved to Port Hedland and this move was necessitated as one of his sons, Roy, had contracted pneumonia and needed care. In Port Hedland McKenna worked on the wharves.

McKenna died on 20 August 1979 at Wine Tree Camp in Marble Bar and was buried in Port Hedland.

== Personal life ==
As a young man he was married, by tribal law, to Uni, a woman twenty years older than him. Later, on 18 August 1950, at the Port Hedland district registrar's office he married Topsy Dougall who had worked as a domestic servant. He and Topsy separated in his later life. They had at least three children together.
