= William Dunn =

William, Willie or Billy Dunn may refer to:

== Politics ==
- Sir William Dunn, 1st Baronet, of Lakenheath (1833–1912), banker and Liberal MP for Paisley
- Sir William Dunn, 1st Baronet, of Clitheroe (1856–1926), British Conservative politician
- William Dunn (South Australian politician) (1841–1891)
- William E. Dunn (1926–2016), mayor of Murray, Utah
- William McKee Dunn (1814–1887), U.S. representative from Indiana
- Bill Dunn (American politician) (William K. Dunn, born 1961), American politician and member of the Tennessee House of Representatives
- Bill Dunn (Australian politician) (William Fraser Dunn, 1877–1951), Australian politician and member of the New South Wales Legislative Assembly

== Sports ==
- William Dunn (bobsleigh) (born 1949), Canadian Olympic bobsledder
- William Dunn (footballer, born 1877) (1877–?), English footballer, played for Manchester United
- William Thomas Dunn (1881–1962), American football player for Penn State
- Willie Dunn (golfer) (died 1952), English golfer and golf course designer
- Willie Dunn Sr. (1821–1878), Scottish golfer
- Billy Dunn (footballer, born 1865) (1865–1921), Scottish footballer with Stoke and other clubs
- Billy Dunn (footballer, born 1910) (1910–1980), Scottish footballer with Celtic, Brentford, Southampton
- Billy Dunn (footballer, born 1920) (1920–1982), English footballer with Darlington
- Billy Dunn (racing driver) (born 1984), American dirt modified racing driver
- Bill Dunn (footballer) (William Richard Dunn, 1915–1997), Australian rules footballer

== Other ==
- William Dunn (industrialist) (1770–1849), Scottish agriculturist, mechanic, and mill owner
- William Dunn (Medal of Honor) (1834–1902), American Civil War sailor
- William Dunn (physician) (c. 1550–1607), president of Royal College of Physicians, see Lumleian Lectures
- William Arthur Dunn (1875–1947), Methodist clergyman in South Australia
- William Ellsworth Dunn (1861–1925), city attorney of Los Angeles, California
- William N. Dunn, American professor of international relations at the University of Pittsburgh
- William R. Dunn (actor) (1888–1946), American film actor and writer
- William R. Dunn (aviator) (1916–1995), American World War II fighter pilot
- Sir William Dunn Professor of Biochemistry, chair at the University of Cambridge (created 1914)
- Willie Dunn (1942–2013), Canadian singer-songwriter, film director, and politician
- Bill Dunn (Pilbara elder) (William Dunn, born 1911), Indigenous Australian pastoralist and elder

== See also ==
- Bill Dunn (disambiguation)
- Dunn (surname)
- Dunn baronets, three British baronetcies with incumbents named William Dunn
- William Donne (cricketer) (1875–1934), English cricketer
- William Donne (priest) (1845–1914), British clergyman
- William Bodham Donne (1807–1882), English journalist
