= Bill Dunn =

Bill Dunn may refer to:

- Bill Dunn (American politician) (born 1961), American politician and member of the Tennessee House of Representatives
- Bill Dunn (announcer), American professional wrestling announcer
- Bill Dunn (Pilbara elder), first Aboriginal Australian man to be granted a pastoral lease in Western Australia
- Bill Dunn (Australian politician) (1877–1951), Australian politician and member of the New South Wales Legislative Assembly
- Bill Dunn (footballer) (1915–1997), Australian rules footballer
- Bill Dunn (rugby league) (born 1967), Australian rugby league player
- Bill Dunn, protagonist in the short story "The Reign of the Superman"

== See also ==
- William Dunn (disambiguation)
- Bill Newton Dunn (born 1941), British politician
