= Dooley Bin Bin =

(1900-1982) Aboriginal community leader

Dooley Bin Bin, also known as Winyirin, (c. 1900 - 24 December 1982) was a Nyangumarta man and leader of his people who is best remembered for his involvement in the Pilbara strike which took place between 1946 and 1949.

== Biography ==
Bin Bin was born around 1900 in the Great Sandy Desert and he is the son of Martukaninykaniny, a Nyangumarta woman, and the name of his father is not recorded. He grew up with his people and, at the age of 9 or 10, he is known to be in the region of what would later become Barramine Station where he assisted in clearing spinifex from the rabbit-proof fence.

He was initiated into manhood around 1911 and, as a young man, travelled through numerous parts of the area and established himself as a respected 'travelling Law-man' who held cultural authority.

By the early 1940s Bin Bin was working at Warrawagine Station and he found himself increasingly distressed about the way that his, and his people, view of the world and way of living in it was being threatened. With this in mind he joined a meeting at Skull Springs, the site of an earlier massacre, where he was nominated to speak on behalf of Don McLeod alongside Clancy McKenna who was one of his kinsmen. Bin Bin and McKenna asked that Aboriginal pastoral workers in the Pilbara region receive a minimum of thirty shillings per week (equal pay with other workers) and that, if this was not granted, they and other workers would strike. Bin Bin also wanted the strikes to trigger changes in wider social justice issues affecting Aboriginal people.

On 1 May 1946 Bin Bin and approximately 800 other workers from more than a dozen Pilbara stations 'walked out' (went on strike) and the majority would not return to work until 1949. Because of their strike they were also often evicted from the stations where they had been living so Bin Bin, and many others, settled at Moolyella, a former mining site, which became the main strike camp.

In May 1946, as a predominant strike organiser and leader, he was arrested along with McKenna and McLeod for 'enticing' Aboriginal people from their employment which was a breach of section 57 of the Native Administration Act 1936; for this he was sentenced to three months hard labour. After national coverage of his arrest and wide support and advocacy Bin Bin was released from prison in June.

Bin Bin would go on the be arrested numerous times throughout the strike and, in one instance, he was chained to the grill of a cell for six days while awaiting trial with a bucket on either side of him, one for water, and one for use as a toilet. Bin Bin's response to this was: ‘[n]ever mind’, we’ll fill up their jails’ as he saw incarceration as one of the main tools of control being used.

In 1963 he was also quoted as saying:

We want to be treated as men, not dogs.
We want the right to own land and Reserves.
We want to be free and independent.
We want education which has always been a shortage in our life.
Education also allows us to retain our tribal culture.
We want recognition of our own laws.

— Dooley Bin Bin, as quoted in The Tribune, 24 April 1963

In 1946 Bin Bin was a part of the group which established Nomads Pty Ltd which established Aboriginal owned businesses and co-operatives in the Pilbara region and often in relation to mining activities. In 1971 they acquired the lease if Strelley Station, near Port Hedland, and Bin Bin relocated there and was part of what became known as 'the Strelley Mob' alongside Jacob Oberdoo. The Strelley Mob sought to continue their resistance there and practice self-sufficiency and cultural business.

He died there on 24 December 1982 and is buried at the station.
