= Daisy Bindi =

Aboriginal Australian Indigenous rights activist

Daisy Bindi (1904–1962), also known as Mumaring, was an Aboriginal Australian Indigenous rights activist and a leader in the landmark 1946 Pilbara strike in Western Australia.

== Early life ==
Bindi was born about 1904 on a cattle-station near present-day Jigalong, on the edge of the Gibson Desert in Western Australia, to parents Jimmy and Milly. Her Aboriginal name was Mumaring. She acquired the name Bindi on her marriage to her husband, though no other records of their union have been found.

As a child she worked on Ethel Creek station, where she learned housework and to manage horses, and became an accomplished horsewoman.

== The 1946 Pilbara strike ==
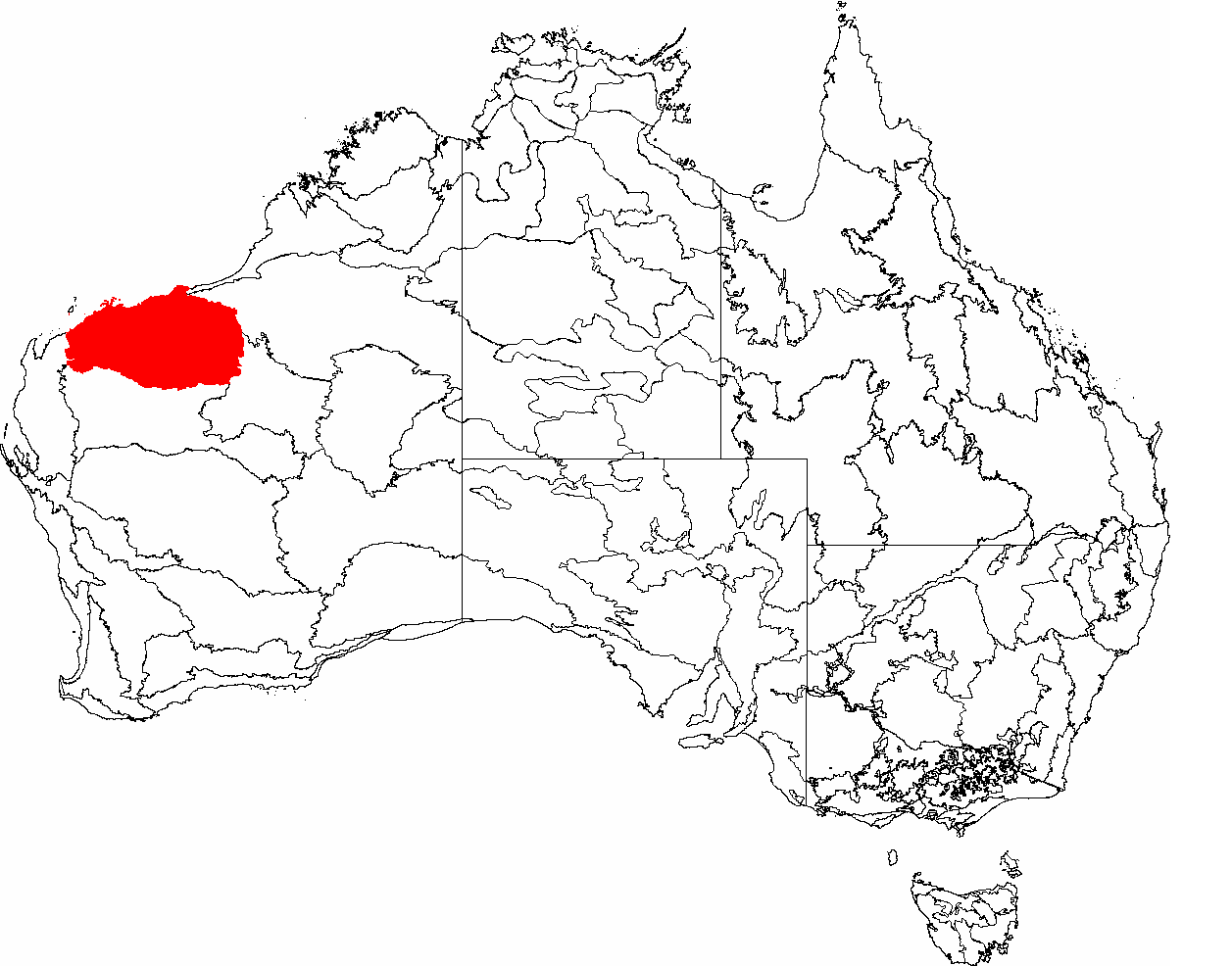
The Pilbara region shown in red

The Pilbara strike was one of Australia's longest, and changed the structure of labour relations in the state of Western Australia. Bindi helped win Aboriginal workers fairer pay and better working conditions.

In 1946 in protest against poor wages and living conditions, unionist and elected spokesman for the Aborigines; Don McLeod and Aboriginal lawmen Dooley Bin Bin and Clancy McKenna, encouraged Aborigines working on sheep and cattle stations in Pilbara to strike for better conditions. Bindi was among the most prominent backers of McLeod, and she led 96 people in the walk-off from Roy Hill station. She lived and worked with the Nyangumarda people on pastoral stations, where she witnessed and experienced indignities from the police in regular police raids on Aboriginal camps. At the time it was common for Aboriginal workers to be paid only in rations of food and clothing.

Daisy demanded wages from her white station boss, which she received and used to hire a truck and collect workers. She organised the strike on the stations near her despite threats of her removal from the area by police and the Native Welfare Department, and her efforts were instrumental in spreading the strike to Pilbara stations further inland. At Nullagine, when confronted by police, Bindi talked her way through and claimed that she had never heard of McLeod, and made her way to Canning Camp on the Shaw River with 86 others.

A result of the strike was the establishment of an independent Aboriginal Co-operative organisation, of which Bindi was an active member, which engaged in mining ventures in the 1950s.

== Later life ==
In the 1950s Bindi lived in the Pindan Cooperative settlement in Port Hedland, a well-ordered collective and one of the first Aboriginal cooperatives formed in Western Australia, where residents worked in the mining industry and received equal pay. In October 1959 she successfully lobbied for a school for Pindan while in Perth to be fitted for an prosthetic limb after losing her leg in an accident in the bush. In Perth she also spoke at meetings of the Western Australian branch of the Union of Australian Women, a group which supported the cause of Aboriginal rights.

In 1960 the Cooperative split into fractions, some who wished to continue with McLeod, and others who thought that his position against mining interests were counterproductive to the Aboriginal cause; which included Bindi.

Bindi died on 23 December 1962 of uraemia, a type of kidney disease, at the Native Hospital in Port Hedland, Western Australia. She was buried in the local cemetery.

== Legacy ==
The poet Kath Walker, later known as Oodgeroo Noonuccal, made Bindi the eponymous heroine of a poem in the book My people: a Kath Walker collection.

The 2004 Black Swan Theatre Company production of the play Yandy, written by Jolly Read and directed by Rachael Maza, tells the story of the Indigenous workers in the Pilbara strike, including Bindi, and their fight for wages, freedom of speech and freedom of movement across their country.
