= 1991 Queen's Birthday Honours (Australia) =

The 1991 Queen's Birthday Honours for Australia were announced on Monday 10 June 1991 by the office of the Governor-General.

The Birthday Honours were appointments by some of the 16 Commonwealth realms of Queen Elizabeth II to various orders and honours to reward and highlight good works by citizens of those countries. The Birthday Honours are awarded as part of the Queen's Official Birthday celebrations during the month of June.

== Order of Australia ==
=== Companion (AC) ===
==== General Division ====
Recipient	Citation	Notes
Dame Judith Anderson, DBE	For service to the performing arts	
Dame Beryl Edith Beaurepaire, DBE	For service to the community, particularly as Chairman of the Council of the Australian War Memorial	
Professor John Philip Chalmers	For services to medical science, particularly in the field of cardiovascular physiology	
Jack Napier Davenport, AO DSO DFC GM	For service to business and industry and to the community	
Associate Professor Frederick Cossom Hollows	For service in public health in Australia and abroad	
Dr Bernard McCarthy O'Brien, CMG	For service to microsurgery	

=== Officer (AO) ===
==== General Division ====
Recipient	Citation	Notes
The Hon Neil Leonard Charles Batt	For service to the Tasmanian Parliament, to politics and to the community	
Trevor Percy Winston Boucher	For service to the Public Service as Commissioner of Taxation	
Professor Maxwell John Charlesworth	For service to philosophy, bioethics and education	
Neil Rex Clark	For service to the community, banking and business	
Professor Adrienne Elizabeth Clarke	For service to science and industry, particularly through the application of biotechnology	
Professor Douglas John Coster	For service to ophthalmology, particularly as Lions Professor of Ophthalmology, Flinders University, South Australia	
Ivan Albert Deveson	For service to the automative industry and to business	
Tony Eggleton, CVO	For service to politics and government as federal director of the Liberal Party of Australia	
John David Enfield	For service to public administration	
Dr Reginald Glover Epps	For service to medical education and to hospital administration	
James Richard Fleming	For service to retailing and to horseracing	
Ashley William Goldsworthy, OBE	For service to information technology, particularly through the Australian Computer Society	
Bruno Gordano Grollo	For service to building and construction and to the community	
Robert Studley Forrest Hughes	For service to art and to the promotion of Australian culture	
Miriam Beatrice Hyde, OBE	For service to music as a pianist and composer and to music education	
Roland David Jackson	For service to the profession of architecture	
Professor James Waldo Lance, CBE	For service to neurology	
Keith Vaux Mattingley, AM	For service to child health research, to the arts and to the community	
Donald Benjamin McDonald	For service to arts administration, particularly as general manager of the Australian Opera	
Emeritus Professor Derek John Mulvaney, CMG	For service to prehistory and anthropology, particularly through the study of Aboriginal cultural heritage	
Margaret Hannah Olley	For service as an artist and to the promotion of art	
John de Burgh Perceval	For service to the visual arts	
Rayden Alfred Perry	For service to science and to the environment, particularly through land resources management	
Professor Renfrey Burnard Potts	For service to education and in particular to applied mathematics	
Dr Lyndel Vivien Prott	For service to environmental and cultural property law	
The Honourable Raymond George Reynolds, QC	For service to the law and to community, particularly through child health and safety organisations	
Sister Margaret Mary Ryan	For service to the care of the dying through the Mercy Hospice Care, Melbourne	
Dr Edward Durham Smith	For service to paediatrics, particularly as a surgeon	
James Graham Ambrose Tucker, MBE	For service to business and to the community	
Dr Elizabeth Kathleen Turner	For service to paediatrics, particularly as a physician	
John Harrison Valder, CBE	For service to business, to politics and to the community	
Donald Sutherland Vanrenen	For service to the wool industry, particularly through merino sheep breeding	
Bruce Vaughan	For service to primary industry and to the community	
The Honourable Robert Alexander Wallace	For service to the law and to the community	
Brett Whiteley	For service to art as a portrait and landscape painter	

==== Military Division ====
Branch	Recipient	Citation	Notes
Navy	Rear Admiral Anthony Lancaster Hunt, AM	For service to the Royal Australian Navy, particularly as the Assistant Chief of Naval Staff (Materiel)	
Army	Major General Warren Edward Glenny	For service to the Australian Army Reserve as Commander of the 3rd Division	
Army	Brigadier Ian James Campbell Hearn	For service to the Australian Army and Australia in representational and military appointments	
Air Force	Air Commodore Richard Norman Gurevitch	For service to the Royal Australian Air Force as Director General Facilities – Air Force	

=== Member (AM) ===
==== General Division ====
Recipient	Citation	Notes
Robert Arthur Abbott	For services to rugby league football	
Dr John Leslie Allsop	For service to neurology	
George Neville Bailey, MBE	For service to greyhound racing administration	
Charles George Bannon	For service to art through printmaking, and to art education, particularly with Aboriginal people in the Northern Territory	
Lindley John Forbes Barraclough	For service to the community	
Victor Bruce Beaver	For service to literature, particularly in the field of poetry	
Malcolm Robert Beazley	For service to education	
Margaret Bell	For service to the development of the volunteer effort in Australia	
Ian Hamilton Berckelman	For service to exportation	
Dr Michael Harry Bolton	For service to public health, particularly in the field of alcohol and drug dependence	
Bernard Kenneth Bowen	For service to primary industry, particularly in the field of fisheries management	
Una Parry Boyce, OBE	For service to war widows	
Nigel Henry Cockburn Butterley	For service to music	
Clive Richard Carr	For service to the sport of lacrosse	
William Joseph Carrick	For service to the community	
Peter Thomas Carter	For service to the Royal Agricultural Society of Western Australia and to the community	
Frederick Douglas Claude Caterson	For service to the New South Wales Parliament, local government and the community	
Professor Maurice Nicholas Cauchi	For service to multiculturalism and to the Maltese community	
The Honourable Gresley Drummond Clarkson	For service to the law	
Albert Henry Corrall	For service to the sport of lawn bowls	
Samuel Sydney Cullen	For service to the Sydney Girls Grammar School, Darlinghurst	
Robert Culver	For service to engineering, particularly in the fields of hydraulics and coastal engineering	
Nellie May Cutler	For service to war widows	
Dr John William Dale	For service to dentistry	
Margaret Florence Darling	For service to the National Trust of Victoria	
Dr George Madgwick Davidson	For service to medicine, particularly in the fields of anaesthesia and intensive care	
Dr Alan David Donald	For service to primary industry in the field of animal health	
Associate Professor Ronald William Farren-Price	For service to music	
Athol Hutchinson Flynn	For service to the import/export industry	
Lillian Georgina Frank, MBE	For service to the community	
Robert Mason Fry	For service to environmental protection and public health, particularly through radiation management	
Robert Frederick Gardner	For service to the orthotics and to those with physical disabilities	
Jack Noel Goodwin, OBE	For service to the community	
Nancy Ethel Gower	For service to the hairdressing industry	
Keith Wilfred Harbour	For service to people with HIV/AIDS	
Charles Maxwell Hazelton, OBE	For service to aviation	
Peter William Hider	For service to aviation and to the community	
Raymond Hodgkinson	For public service	
Dr Janet Rickord McCall Irwin	For service to women's affairs and to the community	
Peter Stuart Isaacson, DFC AFC DFM	For service to the print media and to the community	
Gwynydd Francis James	For service to the publishing industry	
Donald Henry Kay	For service to the arts, particularly in the field of music composition	
Professor George England Kearney, RFD ED	For service to education and to the community	
Kathleen Dorothy Kells	For service to international relations, particularly through missionary work in Bangladesh	
Dr George Campbell Killen	For service to medicine and to the community, particularly through the St John Ambulance Association	
Grahame Edwin King	For service to art education, particularly in the field of printmaking	
Dr Lindsay Wescombe Knight	For service to medicine, particularly in the field of cardiology	
William Austin Kricker	For service to industry, particularly in the field of research and development	
Councillor William Maurice Laver	For service to local government	
John Martin Levins	For service to the Australian Government, particularly through consular assistance to the Australian community in Kuwait	
John Davan Lewis	For service to the construction industry	
His Honour Herbert Bruce MacDonald	For public service and as administrator of Norfolk Island	
Neil Mowbray MacPhillamy	For service to the community, to commerce and to the legal profession	
Professor Maxwell Noel Maddock	For service to conservation and the environment, particularly through the Shortland Wetlands Centre	
William George Mahoney	For service to Australian rules football	
Brian Ernest Mark	For service to business and commerce, particularly through the Service Station Association	
Associate Professor John Potter Masterton	For service to medicine, particularly in the field of burns surgery	
Colin Andrew McAlpine	For service to Australian bloodhorse breeding	
Thomas James McCarthy	For public service to Queensland, particularly in the field of public health	
His Honour Judge Frank Roland McGrath, OBE	For service to the law, particularly in the field of workers' compensation and to the community	
John McGillivray McIntyre, OBE	For service to business and commerce and to the community	
Brian John McKay	For service to telecommunications and the electronics industry	
Brian William McKay	For service to art, particularly through the promotion of contemporary and visual art in Western Australia	
Francis William McKay, MBE	For service to Local Government Association	
Donald John McRae	For service to primary industry, particularly to the sugar milling industry	
Bryan Douglas Mickle	For service to business and commerce and to the community	
Heather Mary Mitchell, OBE	For service to primary industry, particularly through the Victorian Farmers' Federation	
Merle Valma Mitchell	For service to the community	
Laurence James Mooney	For service to local government	
George Francis Moore	For service to local government	
John Joseph Mulheron	For public service to Queensland and to civil engineering	
Allan William Nuske	For service to those with visual impairment	
Terence Patrick O'Gorman	For service to the legal profession	
Lloyd John O'Neil	For service to the book publishing industry	
William Norman Peach	For service to the media and to tourism	
Robert William Pentecost	For service to the building and construction industry	
Dr Valentine Michael Pervan	For service to education	
The Honourable Peter Sydney Maitland Philips	For service to the New South Wales Parliament and to the community	
Professor Issy Pilowsky	For service to medicine, particularly in the field of psychiatry	
Helen Elizabeth Pitt	For service to international relations, particularly through Community Aid Abroad	
Professor Anthony Charles Pollard	For service to medicine, particularly in the fields of genetics and chemical pathology	
Dr John Raftos	For service to medicine, particularly in the field of hypertension and cardiology	
Sister Nola Patricia Riley	For service to nursing, particularly in the field of palliative care and the welfare of the frail aged	
Councillor Trevor William Roach	For service to local government and to the community	
Hugh Robert Maxwell Ross	For service to primary industry, particularly through agricultural education	
David Harold Rowbotham	For service to literature	
Earle William Ryan	For service to education, particularly to those with emotional difficulties	
Sister Madeleine Alice Ryan	For service to women's interests, particularly as principal, Ursula College, Australian National University	
Leon Dudley Sebire	For service to communications, particularly broadcasting	
Maggie Shepherd	For service to clothing design and to exporting	
Hedley Paul Simons	For service to business and commerce, particularly retailing	
Dr John Graeme Sloman, ED	For service to medicine, particularly in the field of cardiology	
Brian David Benjamin Smith	For public service	
Heather Joyce Southcott	For service to the community, particularly in the field of women's affairs	
John Wesley Spiers	For service to the transport industry, particularly shipping	
John Michael Sholto Stacy	For service to engineering, particularly to the automotive industry	
David William Sullivan	For service to the transport industry, particularly aviation	
Ewen William John Tyler	For service to the Australian diamond mining industry and to the community	
Dr Walter Wilhelm Johannes Uhlenbruch	For service to the manufacturing industry	
David Frank Walker	For service to youth	
Dr Alan Courteney Walker	For service to medicine, particularly in the field of paediatrics	
Professor Hans Leo Westerman	For service to the National Capital Development Commission and to the Model Code Task Force for Residential Development	
Patricia Joan Wilkinson	For service to nursing, particularly in the field of education and administration	
Noel Frederick Wilkinson, BEM	For service to rowing administration and to the Olympic movement	
Daphne Ruth Williams	For service to the Aboriginal community as an art coordinator and promoter	
Douglas Fairhurst Wilson	For service to the transport industry, particularly shipping	
Mary May Wilson, OAM	For service to hockey	
Associate Professor Morgan Francis Windsor, MBE	For service to medicine, particularly in the field of thoracic surgery	

==== Military Division ====
Branch	Recipient	Citation	Notes
Navy	Commander Boyd Chapman Robinson	For service to the Royal Australian Navy, particularly as RAN Liaison Officer Middle East	
Navy	Commodore Graham Vaughan Sloper	For service to the Royal Australian Navy, particularly as Commanding Officer HMAS Success	
Navy	Commodore Mervyn John Youl	For service to the Royal Australian Navy, particularly in the area of logistics	
Army	Colonel James Rollo Brett	For service to the Australian Army as Commanding Officer, Soldier Career Management Agency	
Army	Brigadier James Michael Connolly	For service to the Australian Army as Commander of the 3rd Brigade	
Army	Lieutenant Colonel David Alexander Cran	For service to the Australian Army as Staff Officer Grade 1 Logistics, Headquarters 1st Division	
Army	Lieutenant Colonel William Neil Nutt Forbes	For service to the Australian Army in the field of operations and training	
Army	Brigadier Kerry John McManus	For service to the Australian Army as Commander 3rd Training Group	
Army	Major Allen Mark Mortensen	For service to the Australian Army as Officer Commanding the Australian Army Training Project Team in Papua New Guinea	
Army	Lieutenant Colonel Michael Vincent Tabone	For service to the Australian Army in the fields of logistics and community relations	
Army	Major Barbara Elizabeth Watson	For service to the Australian Army in the field of administration	
Air Force	Wing Commander Stephen John Gray, MBE	For service to the Royal Australian Air Force as Staff Officer Air Warfare Maritime Patrol	
Air Force	Wing Commander Geoffrey Ronald Lee	For service to the Royal Australian Air Force as Commanding Officer No 76 Squadron	
Air Force	Squadron Leader Gregory David McDougall	For service to the Royal Australian Air Force as Headquarters Logistics Command Systems Engineer responsible for F111 Strike Aircraft	
Air Force	Wing Commander Robert Earle Pryke	For service to the Royal Australian Air Force as Commanding Officer No 486 Squadron	
Air Force	Squadron Leader Graham Craig Walton	For service to the Royal Australian Air Force as Commanding Officer RAAF School of Photography	

=== Medal (OAM) ===
==== General Division ====
Recipient	Citation	Notes
Phillip Maxwell Adams	For service to pistol shooting	
Ernest Edward Adsett	For service to trade unions and the community	
Maxwell Ainley	For service to the community	
Trevor Allan	For services to rugby union football	
William George Alma	For service as a magician and to the conservation of conjuring memorabilia	
Dr Irene Amos	For service to the arts administration	
Franciscus Egidius Gerardus Arendse	For service to the community and youth	
John Frank Ashby	For service to the community, particularly the security industry	
Sister Mary Theodore Asmar	For service to international relations, particularly to children with disabilities in Madras, India	
Thomas Ernest Atterton	For service to the community, particularly aged people and veterans	
Arthur Edward Baker	For service to the aged people through the Meals on Wheels organisation	
Kerry Neil Bales	For service to the welfare of children suffering from cancer and leukaemia	
Helen Maydos Bales	For service to the welfare of children suffering from cancer and leukaemia	
Anthony Louis Barber	For service to the entertainment industry	
Dr Peter Allan Barr	For service to medicine, particularly through paediatrics and grief counselling	
Jeanette Anne Barritt	For service to public health, particularly through the Australian Cranio Facial Unit	
Mary Josephine Barry	For service to the nursing profession	
Dr Ross Jan Bastiaan	For service to Australian military history	
Clifford Curnow Bennett, ISO	For service to the community	
Michael George Best	For service to people with disabilities	
Una May Bishop	For service to the community	
William Thomas Hayes Bodman	For service to the livestock industry	
Alderman Peter Francis Bolt	For service to local government and to the electricity industry	
Kenneth Hamilton Bond	For service to the transport industry, particularly aviation	
Dr Peter Eric Boon	For service to medicine, particularly the training of ambulance paramedics	
Lynda Margaret Booth	For service to the community, particularly through the Australian Multiple Birth Association	
Francis Charles Boyle	For service to the community	
Joan Maude Brand	For service to children as a foster carer	
Isabella Brierley	For service to local history of the Sydney North Shore area	
Ronald Heath Brockie	For service to veterans, particularly to those with visual impairment	
Harold Arthur Brooks	For service as a ballroom dancing instructor	
Leslie Edwin Brownlie	For service to primary industry	
Maureen Patricia Burchell	For service to the community	
Councillor Albert Roy Burr	For service to local government	
James David Caldwell	For service to the sport of rugby league football	
Dr Robert William Stuart Cannon	For service to dentistry, particularly prosthodontics	
Joseph Carbonaro	For service to the Italian community	
Erik Roger Bede Carlson	For service to the community	
Andrew Carter	For service to promoting community awareness of HIV/AIDS	
Tristram Ogilvie Cary	For service to music	
Diana Elwyn Howard Cavaye	For services to the community and public health	
Terrence William Chapman	For service to education through the Association of Independent Schools, New South Wales	
Alderman Colin Roy Chapman	For service to the community	
Dr Philip Hin Yee Cheung	For service to public health and to service organisations	
Rex Chown	For service to the community, particularly training for the road transport industry	
Edythe Marie Christie	For service to youth	
Mervyn Frank Clark, MBE	For service to the community, particularly veterans	
Henry Lewis Clark	For service to the community, particularly as co-ordinator of search and rescue operations	
Olive Clemens-Palmer	For service to the community, particularly veterans	
Margaret Jane Cockman	For service to the community	
James Ronald Cole	For service to the community, particularly aged people and to those with disabilities	
Thomas Gerald Connolly	For service to the community	
Errol John Considine	For service to the community	
Alison Aston Cox	For service to public health through the Tresillian Family Care Centres	
Donald Boyd Craig	For service to scouting	
Ian Michael Craig	For service to the horse racing industry	
John James Craig	For service to the community, particularly through music and old time dancing	
Betty Dorothea Crisp	For service to the Wilcannia community	
Alan Barons Crompton	For service to the sport of cricket	
Frederick Albert Cullen	For service to the community, particularly veterans	
Gwendoline Jean D'Emden	For service to the arts through the preservation of equipment for sound recording	
Jack Dalton	For service to children's welfare, particularly as instigator of the organisation 'Foster Care'	
Warren James Daly	For service to music as band leader and drummer	
Thomas Charles Davey	For service to local government	
Suzanne Nadine Davidson	For service to the arts as a ballet dancer, teacher and administrator	
Gertrude Mary Davis	For service to the community	
Betty May Dawson	For service to the education of disadvantaged people and those with disabilities	
Sister Margaret Elizabeth Dolan	For service to the community, particularly aged and the bereaved	
Muriel Mary Downie	For service to the lawn bowls, particularly for those with visual impairment	
Maurice James Drake	For service to the community through the Royal Society for the Prevention of Cruelty to Animals, Queensland	
Sister Marie Paule Francoise Duford	For service to Aboriginal people on Palm and Fantome Islands	
Leslie Reginald Dunn	For services to the sport of cycling	
William Dunn	For services to the community, particularly the Aboriginal community	
Patricia Dorothy Dunne	For service to hospital administration	
John Leslie Durkin	For service to the community, particularly through emergency maritime rescues	
The Reverend Brother Peter William Dwyer	For service to education	
Edgar James Ebsary	For service to the community	
George Frederick William Eshman	For service to the sport of soccer	
William John Fennell	For service to the entertainment industry	
Douglas Noel Ferguson	For service to lifesaving and to youth	
Eugene Austrail Flaherty	For service to the aged	
Janice Anne Forrest	For service to youth through the Girl Guides Association	
David John Foster	For service to the sport of woodchopping	
Dr Dermot Clarence Foster	For service to community organisations, particularly the St John Ambulance Association	
Jean Dorothy Franklin	For service to the community	
Alexander Fraser	For service to the community, particularly through Rotary International	
Audrey Victoria Freburg	For service to the disabled	
Alderman Sydney Jack Friedlander	For service to local government	
Jill Eve Gaitely	For service to children's welfare as a foster carer	
Janet Grace Galley	For service to the community, particularly through woman's organisations	
Councillor Robin Gardini	For service to the community and to local government	
Ann Mary Garms	For service to the tourism and hospitality industry and to the community	
The Honourable Harry Walter Gayfer	For service to primary industry, particularly through Co-operative Bulk Handling Ltd, Western Australia	
Gertrude Jean Gibson	For service to the promotion of the arts	
Susan Agnes Giles	For service to the community, particularly through the Biggenden Returned and Services League, Women's Auxiliary	
Lillian May Golding	For service to the community	
Betty Patricia Grant	For service to politics	
Nancy Jean Gurner	For service to public health	
Kenneth Edwin Gutte	For service to education, particularly the rehabilitation of offenders	
William Henry Sutherland Hall, BEM	For service to veterans	
Inspector James Edward Hampstead	For service to the community, particularly during and after the Nyngan floods	
Noel Thomas Hansen	For public service and for service to the community	
Murray Leslie Hansen	For service to youth, particularly through the School Cadet Corps	
Victor William Harris	For service to business and commerce, particularly through the Master Plumbers' Association	
Dorothy Ethel Harvey-Hall	For service to the community, particularly aged people	
Caryl Lynette Haslem	For service to the community	
John Alister Haynes	For service to the community	
Essie Catherine Heazlett	For service to the community, particularly aged people	
Sister Cecily Mary Caterina Heffernan	For service to education, particularly students with hearing impairments	
Yvonne Helberg	For service to international relations and in particular to the health and welfare of people on Rote Island, Indonesia	
Lieutenant Colonel Rowland Alfred Hill	For service to Christian journalism particularly as editor of the War Cry	
Inspector Reginald William Hinchey	For public service with the New South Wales Police Force	
Councillor John James Hoare	For service to the community, particularly during and after the Nyngan floods	
Patricia Blanche Holdenson	For service to the community particularly through charitable organisations	
Richard Murray Hooper	For service to the community	
Mary Margaret Hill Hope	For service to conservation and the environment and to the community	
Captain Kenneth James Hopper, RD	For service to preservation through the Newcastle Maritime Museum and to the community	
Henry Morton Horsburgh	For service to local government and the community	
Alan Francis Howe	For service to the Aboriginal community	
James Maitland Hullick	For service to local government and to the community	
James William Hunt	For service to the promotion of the Australian arts in the United Kingdom	
Frances Huntington	For service to the community, to sport and to youth	
Rosemary Eleanor Hyde	For service to the community	
Robert James Hyde	For service to the community and to local government	
Brian Samuel Jasper	For service to the community and to local government	
John Laurie Jenkins	For service to the community	
John Godschall Johnson	For service to the arts, particularly as a maker and preserver of string instruments	
Gordon Stanley Jones	For service to public health	
David Wynne Jones	For service to scouting	
John Lambert Kane	For service to veterans	
John Mathew Keily	For service to youth	
Henry Douglas Kennerson	For service to education, particularly in the area of administration, and to the building industry	
Dr Allan James Kerr, RFD	For service to public health, particularly through the development of the Coonabarabaran Medical Centre	
Sika Kerry	For service to multiculturalism and to local government	
Mildred Geraldine Joy Kirkpatrick	For service to the entertainment industry	
John Knight	For service to local government and to the community	
John Kosnar	For service to manufacturing and to the Czechoslovak community	
Dr Kalev Kruup	For service to the Estonian community and to multiculturalism	
Dr Peter Murray Last	For service to medicine	
Dorothy Ellen Laughton	For service to sport, particularly for those with visual impairments	
Allen James Lee	For service to the community and to the Anglican Church	
Vernon Lisle	For service to music and to broadcasting	
Lucy Magrath	For service to education, particularly children and young adults with special needs	
Malvina Malinek	For service to the community, particularly women's affairs	
Allan Thomas Marriott	For service to the community	
Albert Martin-Henry	For service to veterans	
Alderman Norman Francis Henry Matesich	For service to local government and to the community	
William Wallace Mathison	For service to the Warwick Hospital, particularly as a radiographer	
Vincent Michael McCaffrey	For service to youth and to the community	
John Malcolm McDonald	For service to those with disabilities	
Hector North McDonald	For service to the community, particularly through surf lifesaving	
Betty Bilton McDonell	For service to the community	
Patrick George McGann	For service to children with disabilities, particularly through the Pathfinders' Auxiliary	
Bevan Francis McInerney	For service to the community, particularly through the St John Ambulance Association	
Ian Edward McIntyre	For service to local government and to the community	
Councillor Donald John McKay	For service to local government and to the community	
Mary Jane McKenzie	For service to veterans	
Alistair Murray McLean	For service to international relations, particularly as Consul-General, Shanghai	
Timothy James McManus	For service to the community	
Albert Russell Mead	For service to primary industry, particularly horticulture	
Ronald Usher Metcalfe	For service to veterans	
Evelyn Millar	For service to the community	
Jessie Millington	For service to the community, particularly through fund raising for charitable organisations	
Neville John Payne Mills	For service to surf lifesaving	
James Ormandy Milne	For service to the community	
Quenton Keith Moloney	For service to community organisations	
Florence May Morley	For service to the community	
John Arthur Morony	For public service	
Kenneth Eugene Morrison	For public service with the Victorian Department of Conservation and Environment	
John Bede Mullen	For service to the community, particularly through the St Vincent de Paul Society	
Kevin Bernard Newman	For service to horse sports	
Paul Colin Newnham, BEM	For service as regional director, Victorian State Emergency Service	
Colin Brynmor Nicholas	For service to hockey	
Richard Edward Nixon	For service to local history and to the community	
Graham Walter O'Donnell	For service to veterans, particularly as a bugler	
Clement Henry O'Keeffe	For service to the community	
Laurel Joy Oakley	For service to youth and to women's affairs	
Marjorie Elizabeth Oke	For service to aged people, particularly women	
George William Oliver	For service to lawn bowls and to the community	
Athol Stephen Owen	For service to veterans	
Rollan Warwick Oxenham	For public service	
David Roy Packham	For service to the development of aerial ignition techniques for bush fire management	
Vasgo Pailagian	For service to the Armenian community	
Councillor Sydney Herbert Pargeter	For service to local government and to the community	
Norman Claude Desmond Parker	For service to opera, particularly technical operations	
Klytie Wingfield Pate	For service to the arts, particularly ceramic art and sculpture	
Councillor Geoffrey Simon Patience, BEM	For service to local government and to Lions International	
The Reverend Kenneth John Patterson	For service to religion, particularly through the Churches of Christ	
Peter Volkert Payens	For service to photography, particularly aerial photography, and to the community	
George Buel Peet	For service to the development of aerial ignition techniques for bush fire management	
Dr James Nixon Pendlebury	For service to the Uniting Church and to education	
Joseph Henry Philbey	For service to the grain industry in South Australia	
Beverley Merle Piper	For service to the community, particularly through Meals On Wheels and as a children's hospital visitor	
Councillor Julius Clive Pollack, MBE	For service to local government and to the community	
Norman George Pope	For service to veterans and to the community	
Dr John Louis Potts	For service to medicine	
James Powell	For service to music, particularly through the Wollongong Conservatorium of Music	
George Henderson Prescott	For service to those with disabilities, particularly through the Chatswood Sheltered Industries	
Herbert William Price	For service to veterans and to Legacy	
Theodore Pridham	For service to the community, particularly through the St Vincent de Paul Society	
Beris Annette Pritchard	For service to the community, particularly through Quota International	
Jenny Barr Prohaska	For service to promoting world peace, and to equal opportunity and the status of women	
The Very Reverend Father Michael Alex Protopopov	For service to the Russian community	
Laurence Maxwell Pulley	For service to music and to youth	
Kosta Athan Radin	For service to the Macedonian community in South Australia	
Allen Hayward Rains	For service to brass band music	
Leo Francis Ramsdale	For service to the community	
Jean Stuart Raymond	For service to the community, particularly as secretary to the Bellingen River District Hospital Ladies Auxiliary	
Dorino Ridolfi	For service to the community, particularly through Rotary	
Laurence Athol Roberts	For service to the barley industry	
Betty Ann Roberts	For service to social welfare	
Bernard James Robertson	For service to the community	
Sidney Robinson	For service to the Western Australian School for Deaf Children	
Francis Hugh Robinson	For service to the citrus growing industry and to the community	
William Francis Rose	For service to cricket	
Lawrence Rosenblum	For service to the Jewish community	
Jack Sammons	For service to veterans and to the community	
James Russell Savage	For service to children, particularly through SPELD	
Norma Nellie Sawicki	For service to those with visual and hearing impairments through library services	
George William Scammell	For service to the community	
Peter Elliston Seager	For service to primary industry, particularly through the Royal National Agriculture and Pastoral Society of Tasmania	
James Joseph See	For service to industrial relations and for public service	
Nathan Segal	For service to the community	
Graeme Carleton Skarratt	For service to children with hearing and visual impairments	
Ronald Mervyn Skinner	For service to the community, particularly veterans	
Alderman Thomas Arthur Slattery	For service to local government	
Marjorie Irene Smith	For service to swimming	
Gregory Robert Smith	For service to veterans	
Annita Mary Sommariva	For service to the community, particularly aged people	
Paul Manfred Sowa	For service to the German community	
Stanley John Spencer	For service to the education of disabled children, particularly through the Nepean Special School	
Ida Verdun Spencer	For service to the community, particularly through Red Cross Transport, South Australia	
Charles George Stening, ED	For service to veterans	
Lieutenant Colonel Peggy Doralene Stephens	For service to the community, particularly through the Salvation Army	
Godfrey Taylor Stephens	For service to the credit union movement in Queensland	
Harold Roy Vincent Stevens	For service to local government and to the community	
Isabel Stix	For service to youth, particularly refugee children	
Alfred John Stone	For service to veterans	
Arthur Edmund Strike	For service to local government and to the community, particularly through the Noah's Ark Toy Library	
Alexander John Sturgeon	For service to the performing arts	
Rex Lionel Swinton	For service to adult education and to the community	
Algimantas Patricijus Taskunas	For service to tertiary education administration and to the Baltic communities	
Jack Taylor	For service to local government and to the community	
Donald David Thomas	For service to the community, particularly through the ambulance service	
Mervyn Herbert Thomas	For service to veterans	
Norma Knight Thornthwaite	For service to the community, particularly through the Association of Women's Forum Clubs of Australia	
Linsley James Thorpe	For service to horse racing and to cricket	
Patricia Adah Tompkins	For service to scouting	
Joseph Torrent	For service to the community	
Boris Trajkov	For service to the Macedonian and other communities	
Henry Shiu-Lung Tsang	For service to ethnic communities	
The Reverend Vernon Kenneth Turner	For service to Christian broadcasting	
Reginald George Tutty	For service to the industry, particularly exhibition game poultry	
Valrene Tweedie	For service to ballet and dance	
Josephine Winifred Van Lawick	For service to those with intellectual disabilities particularly through the Endeavour Foundation	
Speros Vardos	For service to the Greek community	
Giulio Cesare Francesco Vidoni	For service to children with disabilities, particularly through Handital-NSW Inc	
Elma Janet Viertel	For service to hockey	
Ivan Leonard Ray Vincent	For service to the Churches of Christ and to social welfare	
Pauline Patricia Wallace	For service to the community, particularly during the Nyngan floods	
Ross Reginald Walladge	For service to the community, particularly through the St Vincent de Paul Society	
Kenneth John Walter	For service to conservation and the environment	
Hugh Douglas Waring	For service to soil science, forestry and to education	
Lillian Annie Warren	For service to the Girls' Brigade	
Dorothy Louisa Watts	For service to those with disabilities, particularly through the House With No Steps	
Jean Weeks Webster	For service to hockey and to women's bowls	
Barry George Weston	For service to commercial security and to crime prevention	
Randal Derek White	For service to education, to engineering and to the community	
Kevin Claude Michael Whouley	For service to the community	
May Wiblen	For service to the community	
Betty Isabel Willis	For service to youth particularly through the YWCA and the Uniting Church	
Clarice Pearl Willoughby	For service to the community, particularly through Meals on Wheels	
Stella Irene Willson	For service to the community	
Colin Woods	For service to music, particularly through the Salvation Army Melbourne Staff Band	
Henry Woolnough	For service to the community	
Alonzo Pearse Wymond	For service to the preservation of rail transport history and to tourism	
Charlie Yankos	For service to soccer	
Peter Alan Yeldham	For service to the arts, particularly as a script writer	
Keithwell Arthur Young	For service to those with disabilities, particularly through the Spastic Society of Victoria	
Ann Choma Zablud	For service to the Jewish community and to women's affairs	

==== Military Division ====
Branch	Recipient	Citation	Notes
Navy	Chief Petty Officer Michael Rufus Atkin	For service to the Royal Australian Naval Reserve, particularly in the Diving Branch, RANR Sea Training Section and Band of the Brisbane Port Division	
Navy	Petty Officer Gary Ronald Cameron	For service to the Royal Australian Navy, particularly as Senior Victualler and President of the Petty Officer's Mess, HMAS Brisbane	
Navy	Chief Petty Officer Colin Johnson	For service to the Royal Australian Navy, particularly in the field of combat survival training	
Navy	Warrant Officer Wran Suzanne Hope McQuade	For service to the Royal Australian Navy, particularly as the Warrant Officer in charge of sailors' postings in the Directorate of Sailors' Postings	
Navy	Chief Petty Officer Andrew David Williams	For service to the Royal Australian Navy, particularly in providing logistic support for the RAN Task Group deployed in the Middle East	
Army	Warrant Officer Class One Bruce James Arthur	For service to the Australian Army in the field of fire service training	
Army	Warrant Officer Class One Paul Phillip Bond	For service to the Australian Army in the field of technical training and management in Papua New Guinea	
Army	Staff Sergeant Geoffrey Peter Braddon	For service to the Australian Army Reserve as Company Quartermaster Sergeant, Alpha Company 1st/19th Battalion, The Royal New South Wales Regiment	
Army	Warrant Officer Class One Robert Bruce Dabinett	For service to the Australian Army as the RSM 1st Battalion, The Royal Australian Regiment	
Army	Warrant Officer Class Two Allan Robert Forsyth	For service to the Australian Army as Wing Sergeant Major, Reinforcement Wing, Special Air Service Regiment	
Army	Warrant Officer Class One Richard John Hollingdrake	For service to the Australian Army as the Regimental Sergeant Major of the 9th Battalion the Royal Queensland Regiment	
Army	Warrant Officer Class One Trevor James Langley	For service to the Australian Army as Senior Supervisor Warehousing, Moorebank Logistic Group	
Army	Warrant Officer Class One Douglas Thomas Lennox	For service to the Australian Army as the Training Officer, 12th/16th Hunter River Lancers	
Army	Staff Sergeant James Stephen Mangan	For service to the Australian Army in the Defence Cooperation Program field	
Army	Warrant Officer Class One Noelene Toni Singline	For service to the Australian Army in the field of personnel administration	
Army	Captain Allan James Smith	For service to the Australian Army as the Artificer Sergeant Major, Support Area Workshop Battalion	
Army	Warrant Officer Class One Johannes Leonardus Viergever	For service to the Australian Army as the Regimental Sergeant Major, 4th/19th Prince of Wales's Light Horse	
Air Force	Flight Sergeant Geoffrey Charles Bolton	For service to the Royal Australian Air Force for his contribution to C130 aircraft maintenance at No 486 Squadron	
Air Force	Flight Sergeant Francis James Browne	For service to the Royal Australian Air Force as Flight Sergeant Chef at RAAF Base Fairbairn	
Air Force	Warrant Officer Donald William Carmichael	For service to the Royal Australian Air Force as the Warrant Officer-In-Charge of the Maintenance Engineering Analysis Teams Headquarters Logistics Command	
Air Force	Flight Sergeant Paul Joseph Morrissey	For service to the Royal Australian Air Force as senior Surface Finisher at No 2 Aircraft Depot	
Air Force	Warrant Officer Graham Desmond Moy	For service to the Royal Australian Air Force as Warrant Officer-in-Charge of Motor Transport Maintenance Flight No 2 Stores Depot	
Air Force	Sergeant Stephen Eric Ninness	For service to the Royal Australian Air Force with the introduction of the PC9 aircraft to No 2 Flying Training School	
Air Force	Warrant Officer Wayne Anthony West	For service to the Royal Australian Air Force as Warrant Officer-in-Charge of Discipline and Ground Instruction at Airman Aircrew Flying Training School	
Air Force	Sergeant Robert William Wilson	For service to the Royal Australian Air Force as the Senior Non-Commissioned Officer-in-Charge of the Instrument Computer Section No 482 Squadron	
