= Putangaja Ernie Mitchell =

Australian activist and community leader (1900-1970)

Putangaja Ernie Mitchell (c. 1900 - 22 May 1970) as a Nyamal man and an Aboriginal activist and community leader. He is best remembered for his involvement in the Pilbara strike which took place between 1946 and 1949 and the subsequent formation of the Pindan group, later Pindan Pty Ltd, an Aboriginal owned and run co-operative.

After Pindan split in 1959, in what is often referred to as the 'second strike' he formed the Yandeyarra Community (also referred to as Mugarinya) which sits within the town of Port Hedland.

== Biography ==
Mitchell is the son of Nyamal parents Putangaja (also known as Charlie) and Wirrkinya (Minnie) and he inherited the Warinypina totem which relates to the wedge-tailed eagle. He was born somewhere near Strelley Station, south-east of Port Hedland, in Western Australia. Little is known of his early life but, as a young man, he is known to have worked at numerous cattle stations throughout the Pilbara Region where he did stockwork, broke horses and undertook various maintenance jobs. He was well respected for his work and participated in and was a key figure in the Pilbara strike.

After the strike Mitchell chose not to return to his work and became a key figure and leader within the Pindan group between 1946 and 1960. This group first formed during the strike where it was designed to meet the needs of the strikers and provide them with food and income, however, after many returned to station work it became a larger communal movement. Mitchell was especially important within Pindan for, as a ceremonial leader and significant law carrier, he both assisted his people as well as using his knowledge in negotiations regarding many activities of the group including mining.

At Pindan he was core to developing and coordinating the cooperative and this included developing their communal labour system, financial sharing, distribution systems and more. Despite this the actions of Mitchell, and the cooperative more generally, were often limited but government regulations for, as Aboriginal people, they were unable to engage in many legal and regulatory systems including the ownership or leasing of land and the establishment of formal companies. This meant that Mitchell had to rely significantly on Don McLeod, a non-indigenous man and collaborator, and it was only through his help that they were able to formalise and become Pindan Pty Ltd (a private company) in 1955.

When Pindan became a private company Mitchell became a director and, as such, held 1,000 shares and the same amount of shares were held by several other Aboriginal people; each of these major shareholders (including Mitchell) held their shares in trust for the rest of the group that they represented. McLeod, despite establishing the company, held one share. Finally being a private company they were able to scale up their activities and formalised many of their mining ventures and, in 1958, changed their focus to mining manganese at Nimingarra (near to Port Hedland) alongside another company Simdan.

In 1959 Mitchell, and his views, became instrumental in the split of Pindan as, alongside others, he wanted greater independence and to separate from McLeod and his communist ideals. McLeod wanted the cooperative to practice economic collectivism but Mitchell, and fellow director Peter Coppin, wanted greater individual control over the money earner both for themselves and the other people involved. McLeod also objected strongly to Pindan's involvement with government and other non-Aboriginal owned companies and groups which Mitchell felt restricted their growth. These disagreements led to the group splitting with one group being led by Mitchell and the other by McLeod. This is often referred to as the 'second strike'.

As the leader of this group Mitchell established the Yandeyarra Community (also referred to as Mugarinya) which sits within the town of Port Hedland alongside Coppin. There, despite the disagreements with McLeod, community and communal discussion remained a key feature and most decision making was communal. As a leader here Mitchell was known for always seeking to build consensus and for dealing with people equally. People living at the community were paid for their work, including for ceremonial activity. At Yandeyarra they were viewed by the government as squatters for many years and, in 1967, drew close attention when they refused attempts to mine order from a rocky outcrop nearby to their community and on their traditional hunting grounds unless they were paid $50,000.

In 1970, while visiting Marble Bar, Mitchell suffered a stroke and was returned to Port Hedland. He died there on 22 May 1970.

== Personal life ==
Mitchell was married, by tribal law, to Smiler Wanayiningu Mantawaw, Kakaya Lucy and Queenie Kapuny.

He is the father of Doris Eaton who is an Elder of her community and she received the Female Elder of the Year at the 2009 NAIDOC Awards.
