= Charles N. Mock =

American physician and epidemiogist

- Education: Brown University (ScB); Brown University (MD); University of Washington (MPH); University of Washington (PhD)

Charles N. Mock is a professor of Global Health, Surgery, and Epidemiology at the University of Washington and expert on injury prevention and trauma care in low- and middle-income countries.

== Education ==
Mock earned his bachelor's in biology from Brown University in 1977, and after graduating from Brown's Alpert Medical School in 1980, remained in Rhode Island to complete his residency at Rhode Island Hospital. He later completed a fellowship in surgery at Harborview Medical Center.

Mock became board certified in surgery in 1989, and surgical critical care in 1992, both by the American Board of Surgery. He earned a Master's in Public Health in 1994 from University of Washington and his PhD in epidemiology, also from the University of Washington, in 1997.

== Career ==
In 2005, Charles Mock was named the Director of the Harborview Injury Prevention Research Center (HIPRC) at the University of Washington in Seattle, stating that his three goals for the center were: to support the work already being done by the researchers there, to be more involved with local communities and governments to employ proven injury-control strategies, and to increase the center's international reach. Mock held a joint appointment at UW as Professor in the Department of Surgery at the School of Medicine and Professor in the Department of Epidemiology at the School of Public Health. While at UW, Mock co-edited Guidelines for Essential Trauma Care, published by the World Health Organization in 2004.

In March 2007, Mock relocated to serve as a medical officer in the Department of Violence and Injury Prevention at the World Health Organization, and was in charge of developing the WHO's activities on emergency trauma care and burn prevention/treatment. His responsibilities also included pre-hospital care and the development of the trauma and emergency care services network.

Mock has served as the Chair of the Working Group for Essential Trauma Care of the International Society of Surgery (a Society collaboration with the WHO), seeking to improve the care of injured patients. He has also served on the American College of Surgeons Committee on Trauma.

== Research ==
Mock's has various research interests spanning the spectrum of injury control activities, particularly focused on those in low- and middle-income countries. He has extensively with collaborators in Ghana, India, Mexico and Vietnam.

He has served as the Project Director and Series Editor for Disease Control Priorities 3 (DCP3), in which he also co-authored numerous chapters, articles, and reports.

Mock was the lead on the study that developed the WHO Trauma Care Checklist, a simple tool designed for use in emergency units which emphasizes the key elements of life-saving care for injuries. The checklist was tested through a large global collaboration of countries from all income levels, and was found to be appropriate for use in any emergency care setting and easily locally adapted.

== Personal life ==
Mock speaks Spanish, Portuguese, and French.
