= Prott =

Prott is a surname. Notable people with the surname include:

- Alasdair Prott (born 2001), Scottish squash player
- Julius Prott, German tenor and horticulturalist
- Lyndel V. Prott, Australian legal academic
