= Bernard O'Brien (microsurgeon) =

Australian microsurgeon (1924–1993)

- Born: 25 December 1924; Melbourne, Victoria
- Died: 14 August 1993 (aged 67); Kew, Victoria
- Education: Xavier College
- Alma mater: University of Melbourne
- Occupation: microsurgeon
- Years active: 1948–1993
- Known for: Bernard O’Brien Institute of Microsurgery

Bernard McCarthy O'Brien CMG AC (25 December 1924 – 14 August 1993) was an Australian microsurgeon who was considered a pioneer in his field.

== Education ==
After attending Xavier College, O'Brien secured a free place at the University of Melbourne where he commenced combined science and medical degrees in 1943. He graduated with a Bachelor of Science in 1948, a Bachelor of Medicine, Bachelor of Surgery in 1950 and a Master of Surgery in 1955. He later achieved a Doctor of Medicine qualification in 1978.

== Medical career ==
After undertaking resident training at St Vincent's Hospital, O'Brien returned to the University of Melbourne to work as an anatomy demonstrator before becoming a clinical assistant in the plastic surgery unit at the Royal Melbourne Hospital in 1954.

O'Brien then moved overseas when he gained a position as a Nuffield assistant in plastic surgery at the University of Oxford in 1956. However, O'Brien resigned before his training was complete. He then became a plastic surgical registrar at Odstock Hospital in Salisbury in 1957.

After marrying a nurse from the plastic surgery ward in December 1958, O'Brien spent a brief period of time in New York where he was the chief resident to the Plastic and Reconstructive Service at Roosevelt Hospital.

He returned to Melbourne in 1960 where he commenced private practice and an appointment as a clinical assistant at St Vincent's.

During the 1960s, O'Brien pursued his research interests and began surgical investigations into blood vessels, nerves and tendons. In 1968, O'Brien was appointed as an honorary research assistant at St Vincent's Hospital and subsequently won $2000, the first of many research grants.

In 1970, O'Brien formed a new foundation, with Sir William Kilpatrick as chair, to raise money for research and modern facilities which led to a new microsurgery research unit being established, becoming a formal entity of St Vincent's Hospital in 1976 with O'Brien appointed as its director.

By 1978, the unit had seen four thousand operations including the reimplantation of limbs and fingers, and the transfer of muscles, tendons, joints and bones to other parts of the body. In 1984, O'Brien oversaw the construction of a new building to house the Microsurgery Research Centre at Fitzroy at a cost of $1 million.

Throughout his career, O'Brien authored many journal articles and textbooks. His 1977 doctoral thesis, Microvascular Reconstructive Surgery became a classic textbook.

O'Brien served as president of International Federation of Societies for Surgery of the Hand from 1979 to 1983, and from 1979 to 1981 was the president of the International Society of Reconstructive Microsurgery. He was also the vice-president of the Royal Australasian College of Surgeons from 1989 to 1991.

== Honours ==
In 1979, he was awarded the René Leriche prize for vascular surgery from the Societe Internationale de Chirurgie.

For his service to medicine, particularly microsurgery, O'Brien was made a Companion of the Order of St Michael and St George in the 1982 Birthday Honours.

In the 1991 Queen's Birthday Honours, O'Brien was made a Companion of the Order of Australia for his service to microsurgery and medical research.

O'Brien was named Victorian of the Year in 1992.

== Death and legacy ==
O'Brien died in Kew from lung cancer on 14 August 1993.

Following his death, the Microsurgery Research Centre was renamed the Bernard O'Brien Institute of Microsurgery with a portrait of O'Brien by artist Paul Fitzgerald being hung in the foyer.
