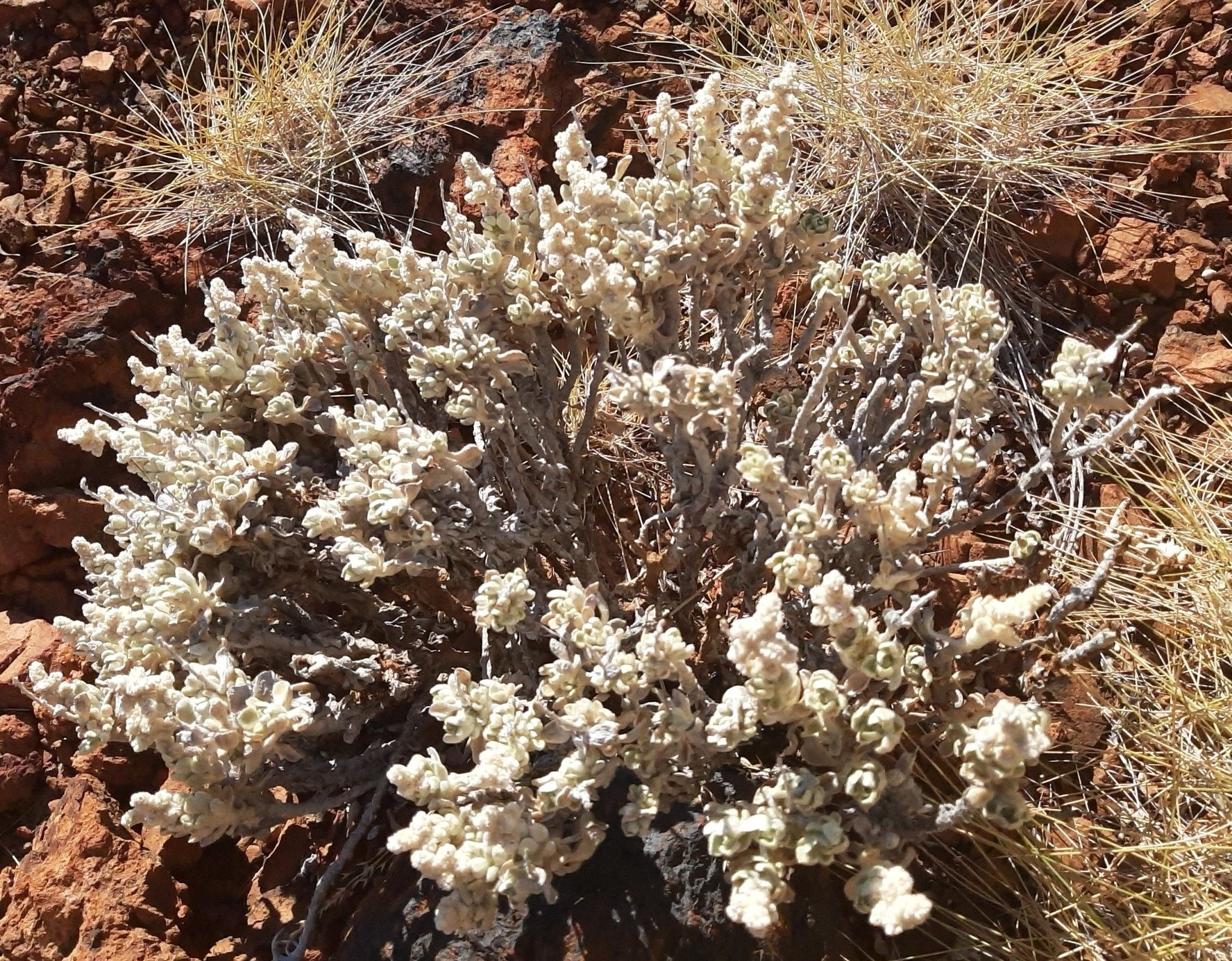

Conservation status
- Priority Four — Rare Taxa (DEC)

Scientific classification
- Kingdom: Plantae
- Clade: Tracheophytes
- Clade: Angiosperms
- Clade: Eudicots
- Order: Caryophyllales
- Family: Amaranthaceae
- Genus: Ptilotus
- Species: P. mollis

Binomial name
- Ptilotus mollis Benl

= Ptilotus mollis =

Species of herb

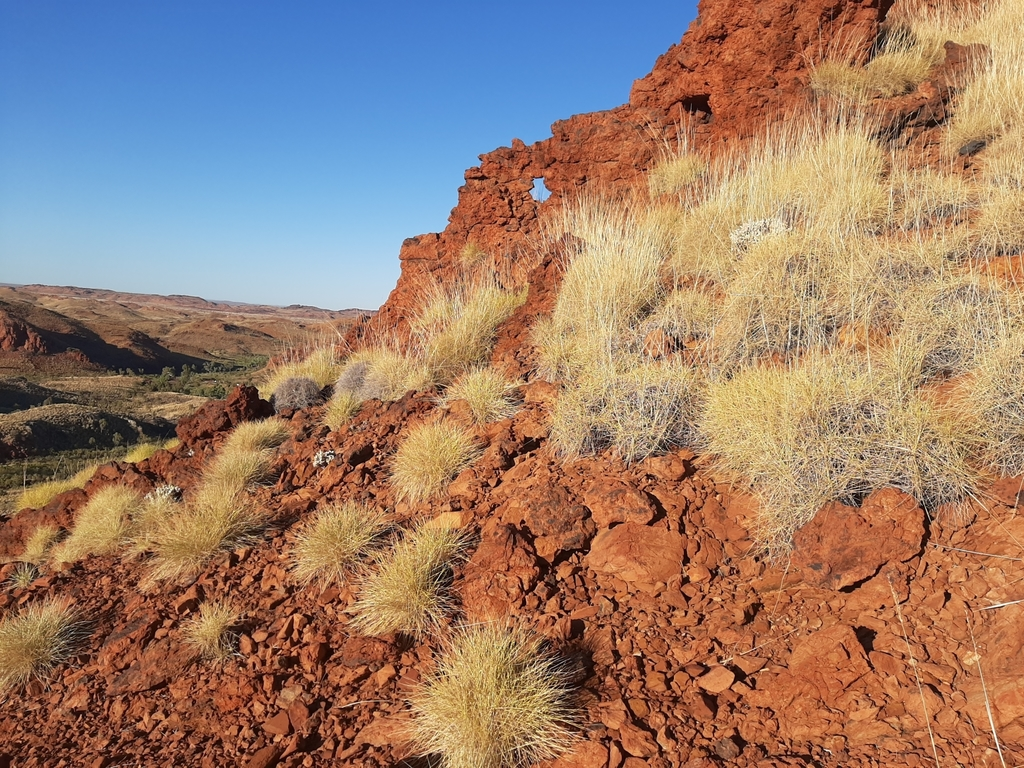
Habit in the Pilbara

Ptilotus mollis is a species of flowering plant in the family Amaranthaceae and is endemic to northern inland Western Australia. It is a low, compact perennial shrub with terete stems, egg-shaped stem leaves and cylindrical spikes of pinkish white flowers.

== Description ==
Ptilotus mollis is a low, compact, perennial shrub that typically grows to a height of up to 30–40 cm (12–16 in), densely covered with long, silky hairs that obscure the surface of young plants, becoming woody and glabrous with age. The stem leaves are egg-shaped, sometimes with the narrower end towards the base, 10–28 mm (0.39–1.10 in) long and 5–12 mm (0.20–0.47 in) wide on a petiole up to 6 mm (0.24 in) long, the leaves densely covered with silky, shaggy hairs obscuring the surface.

The flowers are pinkish white and borne in cylindrical spikes in axils or at the ends of branches in condensed panicles. There are egg-shaped bracts 1.8–2.1 mm (0.071–0.083 in) long and 1.2–1.4 mm (0.047–0.055 in) wide and egg-shaped bracteoles 2.3–2.5 mm (0.091–0.098 in) long and 1.0–1.1 mm (0.039–0.043 in) wide, both bracts and bracteoles densely hairy on the upper surface. The outer sepals are 2.2–3 mm (0.087–0.118 in) long and the inner sepals 2.0–2.8 mm (0.079–0.110 in) long. The style is 0.5–0.7 mm (0.020–0.028 in) long, straight and fixed to the centre of the ovary and there are five fertile, cream-coloured or pink, thread-like stamens, the anthers 0.4–0.5 mm (0.016–0.020 in) long. Flowering occurs from May to August and the seeds are dark brown, glossy, about 1.4 mm (0.055 in) long and 0.9 mm (0.035 in) wide.

== Taxonomy ==
Ptilotus mollis was first formally described in 1970 by Gerard Benl in the Journal of the Royal Society of Western Australia from specimens collected on the Gorge Range on Warralong station. The specific epithet (mollis) means 'soft'.

== Distribution and habitat ==
This species of Ptilotus grows on stony hills and scree, often with ironstone, mostly in the Pilbara bioregion, but also extending to the Little Sandy Desert bioregion, and is typically associated with Acacia or Triodia-dominated plant communities.

== Conservation status ==
Ptilotus mollis is listed as "Priority Four" by the Government of Western Australia Department of Biodiversity, Conservation and Attractions, meaning that is rare or near threatened.

== See also ==
- List of Ptilotus species
