= John Chalmers (medical researcher) =

Australian medical researcher

John Chalmers AC FAA FAHMS
- Born: 12 January 1937 (age 89)
- Occupation: medical researcher
- Years active: 1959-present
- Known for: extensive research into hypertension
- Notable work: Manual of Hypertension
- Title: Emeritus Professor

John Philip Chalmers (born 12 January 1937) is an Australian medical researcher, best known for his work in the field of cardiovascular physiology, specifically for his research into hypertension.

He is an Emeritus Professor of Medicine at both the University of Sydney and Flinders University in Adelaide and a professor of medicine at the University of New South Wales in Sydney. Chalmers is also a senior director at the George Institute for Global Health.

== Education ==
Chalmers graduated from the University of Sydney with a Bachelor of Science in 1960, followed by a Bachelor of Medicine, Bachelor of Surgery in 1963.

In 1967, he completed a PhD at the University of New South Wales, researching the control of blood pressure by the nervous system which he then pursued as an overseas research fellow at the Massachusetts Institute of Technology in Boston and the Royal Postgraduate Medical School in London.

== Career ==
Upon his return to Australia, he was appointed as a senior lecturer in medicine in 1973 and then as associate professor in medicine at the University of Sydney in 1973.

Throughout his career, he has authored many journal articles. In 2002, he co-edited Manual of Hypertension.

In 1975, Chalmers became the foundation chair of medicine at Flinders University's Medical Centre in Adelaide - a role he served in until 1996 when he returned to Sydney to accept a position as chairman of research at Royal North Shore Hospital and sub-dean of research at the Northern Clinical School of the University of Sydney, headquartered at the hospital.

Chalmers has served in numerous roles with various medical organisations including the Australian Academy of Science, Australian Society for Medical Research, Royal Australasian College of Physicians, National Health and Medical Research Council, the International Society of Hypertension, and World Health Organization's International Society of Hypertension Liaison Committee where he coordinated the development of the 1999 guidelines of hypertension treatment.

Each year Flinders University's College of Medicine and Public Health hosts the annual Chalmers Oration to commemorate Chalmers' work as their foundation professor of medicine.

== Awards ==
In 1981, Chalmers was awarded the Wellcome (Australia) Medal. He was elected a Fellow of the Australian Academy of Science in 1987.

Chalmers was made a Companion of the Order of Australia in the 1991 Queen's Birthday Honours in recognition of his services to medical science. In 1996, Chalmers was awarded the RT Hall prize of the Cardiac Society of Australia & New Zealand.

He received the Volhard Medal from the International Society of Hypertension in 1998.

In 2001, he received the Centenary Medal for his services to medical research and to Australian society.

The Journal of Hypertension published a series of editorial reviews in honour of Chalmers in 2002.

Chalmers was the recipient of the Alberto Zanchetti Lifetime Achievement Award of the European Society of Hypertension in 2008. He received the Research Medal of the National Heart Foundation the following year.

He was made an Officer of the Ordre national du Mérite in 2010.

In 2011, Chalmers received a Ministerial Award for Cardiovascular Research Excellence and in 2016 he was awarded the Cottrell Medal for Epidemiology of the RACP. In 2015 he was elected a Fellow of the Australian Academy of Health and Medical Sciences.

Chalmers has been conferred with honorary doctorates from the University of Queensland, the University of Sydney and Lund University.
