= Peter Coppin =

Australian activist and community leader (1920-2006)

Peter Coppin, also known as Karriwarna and Kangkushot BEM,(1 February 1920 - 11 September 2006) was a Nyamal elder and an Aboriginal activist and community leader. He is best remembered for his involvement in the Pilbara Strike, which took place between 1946 and 1949, in which he was an emerging leader and, following this, his involvement in the Pindan group.

His life is recorded in the book Kangkushot: the life of Nyamal Lawman Peter Coppin (1999) which he co-wrote with Jolly Read.

== Biography ==
Coppin was born near Yarrie Station and his Nyamal language name, also referred to as birth-name is Karriwarna. He was the son of Nurparn (Sally), a Nyamal woman and Christopher Coppin Junior, a non-indigenous pastoralist. In the Nyamal language he was what was known as a mardamarda or 'red-red' meaning that he had mixed ancestry and, because of this, he was at great risk of becoming part of the Stolen Generations.

Much of Coppins early life was spent at Warralong station, where he lived with his mother, and there he became a stockman and station hand who exhibited a broad range of skills. It was when working here that Coppin received the nickname Kangkushot, which would follow him through much of his life. This name is the result of being accidentally shot in the knee while working and the name itself is a combination of the Nyamal word kangku, meaning knee, and 'shot'. In his work at the station, and in the lead up to the strike, Coppin was paid less than half of the wages paid to white workers.

Coppin was not among the first workers to strike during the Pilbara Strike and most of those at Warralong stayed on the job for a number of weeks following the 1 May 1946 start date. However, they soon realised the importance of their support and joined. Although Coppin was still a young man but, despite this, was an emerging leader and spent much of the strike living at the Twelve Mile camp (also known as Tjalku Wara) and in 1947 police reports identified him as a part of the leadership committee there.

Following the end of the strike Coppin lead a wolfram mining camp at Cooke's Creek through the Northern Development and Mining (NODOM) which was the first Aboriginal-owned company in Western Australia. By 1952 Coppin was in charge of the companies mining operations throughout the Pilbara and also took over the management of Yandeyarra Station, also known as the Yandeyarra Community, which he ran with the active assistance of a women's committee.

He was also a member of the Pindan group and, when they became a private company (Pindan Pty Ltd) in 1955 he became one of the directors and the holder of 1,000 shares. When the company split Coppin left with Putangaja Ernie Mitchell and, following his sudden death in 1970, took over much of his role including as director of the Mugarinya Corporation.

Coppin died on 11 September 2006 and, at the time of his death, was the most senior lawman and Aboriginal leader in the Pilbara. His funeral was attended by over 1,500 people.

== Awards ==
- On 1 January 1972 he received the British Empire Medal.
- On 1 January 2001 he received the Centenary Medal.
- In 2002 he was the joint winner of Male Elder of the Year at the NAIDOC Awards.
- On 22 November 2002 he was named Freeman of the Town of Port Hedland and was the first Aboriginal person to receive this title.
