= Meentheena Station =

Historic cattle station in Western Australia

Meentheena Station is a historic cattle station in Western Australia.

It is located approximately 70-80 kilometers east of Marble Bar.

It operated as a cattle station for many years, before being turned into a retreat location for Australian military veterans.

As a cattle station, it was at one stage operated by a pastoralist named Charlie Blair. Bill Dunn worked there at an early stage of his career as a cattle drover. The station has been noted by historians as a relatively good place of work for Aboriginal Australians of the time, with Blair paying his aboriginal workers in cash wages prior to the practice becoming more widespread. Blair was also noted to have treated Dunn as family and not discriminated against him on account of his race.
