= William Dunn (footballer, born 1877) =

English footballer

William Dunn (July 1877 – unknown) was an English footballer. His regular position was as a forward. Born in Middlesbrough, he played for South Bank and Manchester United.
