= Lyndel V. Prott =

Legal academic

Lyndel Vivien Prott AO FAHA (born 1940) is a legal academic who specialises in cultural heritage law both within Australia and internationally. As of 2020 she is an honorary professor in the School of Law at the University of Queensland.

Prott completed her secondary education at Sydney Girls' High School, winning a Commonwealth Scholarship. She graduated from the University of Sydney in Arts in 1961, followed by Law in 1964.

She was employed by the University of Sydney in 1974 as a senior lecturer. In 1984 she became a reader in law. In 1990 she was awarded one of the first ten personal chairs by the university, holding the Chair of Cultural Heritage Law from 1991 to 1995.

In 1983 she was appointed by the Director-General of UNESCO as joint rapporteur on the trafficking of cultural property. She filled many roles within UNESCO before being Director of the Cultural Heritage Division from 2000 to 2002. Returning to Australia, she lectured at the Australian National University in international heritage law from 2003 to 2006, before moving to the University of Queensland.

== Awards and recognition ==
Prott was made an Officer of the Order of Australia in the 1991 Queen's Birthday Honours for "service to environmental and cultural property law". She was elected an honorary fellow of the Australian Academy of the Humanities in 2005.

The University of Sydney conferred on her a Doctor of Laws (honoris causa) in May 2004.

== Selected publications ==
- Prott, Lyndel V.; O'Keefe, Patrick J. (1984), Law and the cultural heritage, vol. 1 – Discovery and excavation, Professional Books Ltd, ISBN 978-0-86205-060-3
- Prott, Lyndel V.; O'Keefe, Patrick J. (1989). Law and the cultural heritage. Vol. 3 – Movement. Abingdon, Oxon: Professional Books. ISBN 978-0406120717.
