= Mount Edgar Station =

Pastoral lease in Western Australia

Coordinates: 21.2432°S 120.1664°E

Location in Western Australia

Mount Edgar Station, often referred to as Mount Edgar, is a pastoral lease that once operated as a sheep station but now operates as a cattle station.

It is located about 45 kilometres (28 mi) south east of Marble Bar and 190 kilometres (118 mi) south east of Port Hedland and in the Pilbara region of Western Australia. The property is bounded by Yarrie Station.

The property was established in 1890 by George Dudley (known as Dudley) and Alfred Howden Drake-Brockman (known as Howden), who both died early in the 1900s. In 1903 it was owned by Messrs Corboy and Company, who produced the first wool clip of 61 bales of wool.

Copper was being mined at the property in 1907.

W.J. Corboy still owned the property in 1908, when he placed it on the market. The property was advertised as occupying an area of 172,000 acres (69,606 ha) and was stocked with 6,000 sheep and 180 cattle. It had 10 wells fitted with windmills and had 54 miles (87 km) of fencing.

In 1925 many windmills were destroyed and station property wrecked at Mount Edgar Station by a cyclone that passed through the area.

Employees at the station walked out on strike in 1946. By 1949 agreements for improved conditions and pay were negotiated at both Mount Edgar and Limestone stations and the strike was effectively ended.

== See also ==
- List of ranches and stations
- List of pastoral leases in Western Australia
