= Billy Dunn (racing driver) =

American racing driver (born 1984)

- Nationality: American
- Born: June 6, 1984 (age 42) Watertown, New York

Modified racing career
- Debut season: 2001
- Car number: 3, 9, 14, 23, 49
- Championships: 16
- Wins: 143

Previous series
- Kart racing

Championship titles
- 2021 DIRTcar 358 Modified Series Champion; 2002 New York State IMCA Modified Champion
- Statistics up to date as of August 31, 2026.

Billy Dunn (born June 6, 1984) is an American racecar driver who competes in dirt modifieds.

== Racing career ==
Dunn began his racing career in his early teens racing go-karts. In 2001, he began racing modifieds sanctioned by the International Motor Contest Association (IMCA), capturing the New York State Modified title the following year. A move up to the northeast dirt modifieds was fraught with two years of mechanical problems before he garnered his first division win in 2006.

Since then, Dunn has captured multiple track championships competing in New York at Can-Am Speedway in LaFargeville, Mohawk International Raceway in Hogansburg, Utica-Rome Speedway in Vernon, and Fulton Speedway.

Dunn has won at sixteen different venues, including Georgetown Speedway, Delaware; Merritville (Thorold) and Cornwall Speedways in Ontario; and AIS (New Breman), Thunder Ally (Evans Mills), Thunder Mountain (Lisle), and Oswego Speedways in New York State. He won the Super Dirt Week main event in 2013 at the Syracuse Mile.
