= Pilbara strike =

Workers strike in the 1940s in Western Australia

The Pilbara strike was a landmark strike by Aboriginal Australian pastoral workers in the Pilbara region of Western Australia. The strike lasted between 1946 and 1949, and was the longest industrial action in Australian history. The strikers demanded social recognition, payment of fair wages, and an improvement in working conditions.

Participating in the strike were 800 Aboriginal pastoral workers who walked off the large pastoral stations in the Pilbara on 1 May 1946, and also from employment in the two major towns of Port Hedland and Marble Bar. The strike did not end until August 1949, and even after its conclusion many Aboriginal Australians refused to return to work for white station owners.

The strike has been noted for its significance for the human rights of Aboriginal Australians. Historians have noted it as the first industrial strike by Aboriginal people since colonisation and the longest industrial strike in Australian history. It is regarded as a landmark historical moment in the history of the human rights, cultural rights, and native title rights of Indigenous Australians.

== Working conditions ==
For many years Aboriginal pastoral workers in the Pilbara were denied cash wages and were only paid in supplies of tobacco, flour, and other necessities. The pastoral stations treated the Aboriginal workers as a cheap slave labour workforce to be exploited. Under the state's Aborigines Act 1905, workers could only leave the station with the manager's permission. Many tried to leave the stations on which they worked, but were met with legal resistance; those who were unsuccessful could be whipped and those who escaped were hunted by police and returned in chains. The situation was that "while Aboriginal labour was required, Aboriginal people were treated as if they were expendable".

European attacks and brutal shootings of whole family groups of Aboriginal Australians are part of the history of the region, though often not well documented. One attack took place at Skull Creek in the Northern Territory a few kilometres north of Ti-Tree in the 1870s, which resulted in the bleached bones and thus the name for the place. In 1926 the Forrest River massacre was carried out by a police party on the Forrest River Mission (later the Aboriginal community of Oombulgurri), in the East Kimberleys. Though there was a royal commission into the reported killing and burning of Aboriginal people in the East Kimberley, the police allegedly involved were brought to trial and acquitted.

As well as proper wages and better working conditions, Aboriginal lawmen sought natural justice arising from the original Western Australian colonial Constitution. As a condition for self-rule in the colony, the British Government insisted that once public revenue in WA exceeded 500,000 pounds, 1 per cent was to be dedicated to "the welfare of the Aboriginal natives" under Section 70 of the Constitution. Succeeding colonial and state governments legislated to remove the funding provisions for "native welfare".

== The strike ==
The strike was coordinated and led by Aboriginal lawmen Dooley Bin Bin and Clancy McKenna; and Don McLeod, an active unionist and member of the Communist Party of Australia for a short period. The strike was planned at an Aboriginal law meeting in 1942 at Skull Springs (east of Nullagine), where a massacre had previously occurred. The meeting was attended by an estimated 200 senior Aboriginal representatives representing twenty-three language groups from much of the remote north-west of Australia. Discussions were protracted, with the meeting requiring 16 interpreters and lasting six weeks. McLeod, the only European-Australian present, was given the task of chief negotiator. While not present, Bin Bin was elected to represent the Aboriginal peoples from unsettled desert lands. Later McLeod and Bin Bin chose McKenna to represent those from the settled areas. The strike was postponed until after the Second World War had ended in 1945.

Peter Coppin, also known as Kangkushot, (1920–2006) was another one of the strike leaders. Regarded as a pioneer of the Aboriginal rights movement in the 1940s, he was awarded the British Empire Medal in 1972, and appointed NAIDOC Elder of the Year in 2002.

Crude calendars were taken from one station camp to another in early 1946 to organise the strike. The efforts, if noticed by the white people present, were dismissed and laughed at. The date of May 1st was chosen not only because it was International Workers' Day but also because it was the first day of the shearing season. On 1 May 1946, hundreds of Aboriginal workers left the pastoral stations and set up strike camps.

The strike was most effective in the Pilbara region. Further afield in Broome and Derby and other inland northern towns, the strike movement was harshly suppressed by police action and was more short lived. Over the three years, occasionally strikers went back to work, while others joined or re-joined the strike.

At the commencement of the strike in 1946, McLeod was an Australian Workers' Union delegate at Port Hedland wharf who motivated support by the Australian labour movement. The Western Australian branch of the Seamen's Union of Australia eventually put a blackban on the shipment of wool from the Pilbara. Nineteen unions in Western Australia, seven federal unions and four Trades and Labour councils supported the strike. The strike stimulated support from the Woman's Christian Temperance Union, who helped establish the Committee for the Defence of Native Rights. This organisation raised funds for and publicised the strike in Perth including organising a public meeting in the Perth Town Hall attended by 300 people.

Many of the Aboriginal strikers served time in jail and this was due, in part, to Bin Bin's policy of non-resistance that he encouraged those involved to employ. Of this Banjima man Marshall Smith, who was involved in the strike, said: "Old Dooley's strategy was, no we don't fight, we don't use physicality, we won't go into spearing … he said what we do is, we go to jail. We will fill the jails." At one stage in December 1946, McLeod was arrested in Port Hedland during the strike for "inciting Aborigines to leave their place of lawful employment"; the Aboriginal strikers marched on the jail, occupied it and freed McLeod. McLeod was gaoled a total of seven times during the period, three times for being within five chains (100 metres (330 ft)) of a congregation of "natives".

Local strike leader Jacob Oberdoo was also jailed three or four times and suffered humiliations and deprivations of many kinds during the strike, but maintained his dignity and solidarity for the length of the strike. In 1972 he was awarded the British Empire Medal, but turned it down. He stated that: "You put medals on dogs, our people don't have any land. They don't have any money and they haven't had much help from any government. They don't need medals".

The strikers sustained themselves with their traditional bush skills, hunting kangaroos and goats for both meat and skins. They also developed some cottage industry which brought some cash payment such as selling buffel grass seed in Sydney, the sale of pearl shell, and in surface mining.

Aboriginal women played a vital role in the strike, both as workers on strike and in the establishment of strikers' camps, though their involvement has not been documented to the same extent as that of the men. Daisy Bindi, a Nyangumarta woman, led a walk-off of 96 workers at Roy Hill Station to join the strike. Before the strike commenced, Bindi organised meetings in south-eastern Pilbara, which attracted police attention, and authorities threatened to remove her from the area. During the strike she transported supporters to the strikers' camps, talking her way through a police confrontation. Her efforts played a large part in spreading the strike to the further stations in inland Pilbara.

On 14 April 1949, Bin Bin, McKenna and 40 other strikers, including Crow Yougarla, were arrested at gunpoint, and a number of mass arrests followed. The leaders spent months awaiting trial, some of the time behind bars. Wages and improved conditions were eventually won by the strikers on Mount Edgar and Limestone Stations, after the managers realised that they could not continue to operate without Aboriginal labour.

In August 1949, the Seamen's Union agreed to blackban wool from stations in the Pilbara onto ships for export. On the third day after the ban had been applied, McLeod was told by a government representative that the strikers' demands would be met if the ban was lifted. Weeks after the strike ended and the ban lifted, the government denied making any such agreement.

== After the strike ==
After the strike concluded, the stockmen had to negotiate their own pay. Many Aboriginal people refused to go back to working in their old jobs on the stations. It was not until 1968 that a full award rate for Aboriginal workers was enshrined in law.

Eventually they pooled their funds from surface mining and other cottage industries to buy or lease stations, including some they had formerly worked on, to run them as cooperatives.

== Legacy ==
Aboriginal plaintiffs from Strelley Station finally commenced an action in the Supreme Court of Western Australia in 1994, seeking a declaration that the 1905 repeal of section 70 was invalid. In 2001, after protracted litigation, the High Court of Australia held that the 1905 repeal had been legally effective.

In 2010 four streets in the Canberra suburb of Bonner were named after the strike leaders and people instrumental in organising it. These streets are: Clancy McKenna Crescent, Dooley Bin Bin Street, Peter Coppin Street and Don McLeod Lane were all named after the men instrumental in organizing the strike.

=== In the arts ===
- The poet Dorothy Hewett visited Port Hedland in 1946 and wrote the poem "Clancy and Dooley and Don McLeod" about the strike, which was subsequently put to music by folk musician Chris Kempster and recorded by Roy Bailey.
- The 1959 documentary novel Yandy by Donald Stuart deals with the strike.
- In 1987 a documentary film was made about the strike by director David Noakes, titled How the West was Lost.
- Kangkushot: the Life of Nyamal Lawman Peter Coppin, by Jolly Read and Peter Coppin, tells the story of Kangku's life including his leadership in the strike and after in setting up Yandeyarra station which still runs today. It was shortlisted for the 1999 Western Australian Premier's Book Awards.
- Yandy, a play written by Jolly Read after being commissioned by Black Swan State Theatre Company, tells the story of the strike and its leaders and families. It won the 2004 Western Australian Premier's Book Award for best script.
- Artist Nyaparu Gardiner, who was born into the strike, has portrayed it many times in his work.

== See also ==
- Bill Dunn (Pilbara Bushman)
- Wave Hill walk-off
