= Ross Bastiaan =

Australian dentist

Personal details
- Born: Melbourne, Victoria
- Profession: Dentist

Ross Jan Bastiaan AM RFD (born 1951) is an Australian Melbourne area-based specialist dentist (a periodontist) and colonel in the Australian Army Reserve. He has installed bronze plaques around the world at monuments for and sites of past Australian military battles.

Bastiaan has served on the Australian Government's War Memorial Council. He has assisted Victoria police with forensic dentistry. He has written and contributed to a number of books. He was awarded the Medal of the Order of Australia in 1991 for service to Australian military history and promoted to Member of the Order of Australia in 2006 for services to military history and dentistry. He was awarded the Centenary Medal in 2001 for his work with veterans. His life has been covered in the Australian media.
