= Issy Pilowsky =

Issy Pilowsky AM (1935 – August 7, 2012) was an Australian psychiatrist. He was a professor of psychiatry at the University of Adelaide from 1971 to 1997. He is known for the concept of abnormal illness behaviour, writings around pain and somatoform disorders. Doctors can find patients who express their symptoms in unusual ways problematic to manage and Pilowsky's work has proven useful in assisting medical practitioners and other in this difficult territory.

Pilowsky obtained a medical degree in South Africa before developing an interest in the experience of pain when working under the well respected psychiatrist Erwin Stengel in Sheffield, England. He later worked in universities in Sydney and Adelaide, Australia.

Pilowsky made a significant contribution to the medical literature through the development of the concept known as abnormal illness behaviour. When a person becomes unwell, they take on the sick role as defined by Talcott Parsons. Those who have accepted the sick role demonstrate that they are unwell through illness behaviour. Mechanic and Volkart had previously formulated the term illness behaviour. Certain individuals may manifest illness behaviour which is outside the range of that normally accepted by their society. Pilowsky had previously been struck by general hospital patients who were totally preoccupied by their pain or alternatively seemed almost completely oblivious to their plight. Accordingly, abnormal illness behaviour may be illness denying or illness affirming, that is minimising or excessive relative to the prevailing norms.

Pilowsky developed the Illness Behaviour Questionnaire, a research instrument which can be used to measure the dimensions of abnormal illness behaviour.

In 1991 he was made a Member of the Order of Australia for "service to medicine, particularly in the field of psychiatry". He was elected Fellow of the Academy of the Social Sciences in Australia in 1990.

Pilowsky died in 2012 of a brain tumor.
