= Native Administration Act 1905 =

Western Australian legislative act affecting the Indigenous population

Native Welfare Act 1905

Parliament of Western Australia
- Enacted by: Legislative Assembly
- Enacted: 1905
- Status: Repealed

The Native Administration Act, originally titled the Aborigines Act, and later renamed to the Native Welfare Act; was a legislative act of the Western Australian legislature. Alongside the Aborigines Protection Act (1905), the act enabled the surveillance and control of Aboriginal people by agents of the colonial state government in the early 20th century.

The act sought to regulate Aboriginal people "more than any other legislation in Western Australia". It was formerly named the Aborigines Act on its original passage in 1905, and remained in its original form until substantial amendments in 1936. Both forms of the act were passed by the WA Labor governments.

== Legislative history ==
The act was originally passed as the Aborigines Act in 1905. It was renamed and reformed in 1936, with a new short title The Native Administration Act 1905–36. This reform took place under the Willcock ministry of the Labor Government. It followed a report from the Moseley Royal Commission by that recommended upholding the authority of the Aborigines Department under Chief Protector A. O. Neville.

It was introduced in the lower house by Frank Wise. In the ensuing parliamentary debates, the bill was primarily questioned by members of the Country Party. Charles Latham described as "farcical" the requirement that all Aboriginal marriages need government consent. Percy Ferguson said of "half-caste" persons: "Is that justified ... ? A number of them are as intelligent as the Chief Protector himself."

William Kitson delivered the bill's second reading speech in the WA Legislative Council. Charles Wittenoom also spoke in support.

== Effects of the act ==
Noteworthy effects on indigenous Australians from the act included:

- The appointment of the Commissioner as the legal guardian of every Aboriginal child until the age of 21, with the ability to alter custody arrangements for the child.
- Empowerment of the minister to issue a warrant providing for the arrest and imprisonment of any Aboriginal Australian, without process
- Creation of a criminal offence for Aboriginal Australians to move north of the 26th parallel
- Creation of a criminal offence for Aboriginal Australians to leave their jobs (substantively enabling their enslavement)
- Empowerment of police officers to order Aboriginal people to leave towns
- The ability to declare a city as a "prohibited area for Aborigines" (substantively enabling racial segregation)
- Making it an offence for an Aboriginal female to be within two miles of the mouth of a creek or inlet used by pearlers between sunset or sunrise
- The ability to banish an Aboriginal person from their country for cattle killing
- The requirement for an adult Aboriginal person to obtain the commission's consent to marry

The above restrictions were accompanied by those imposed by the Aborigines Protection Act, which did not permit indigenous Australians to travel below the 26th parallel without a permit from the minister, and made it an offence to move from the station on which they resided.

The regulations preventing indigenous movement in Western Australia were enforced until the 1960s.

== See also ==
- Aboriginal history of Western Australia
- Bill Dunn (Pilbara elder)
