= Bill Dunn (footballer) =

Australian rules footballer, born 1915

Personal information
- Full name: William Richard Dunn
- Born: 7 February 1915; Bendigo, Victoria
- Died: 1 November 1997 (aged 82)
- Height: 179 cm (5 ft 10 in)
- Weight: 82 kg (181 lb)

Playing career^{1}
Years	Club	Games (Goals)
1941	North Melbourne	3 (0)
- ^{1} Playing statistics correct to the end of 1941.

William Richard Dunn (7 February 1915 – 1 November 1997) was an Australian rules footballer who played with North Melbourne in the Victorian Football League (VFL).

He later served in the Australian Army in World War II.
