= Yandeyarra Community =

Community in Western Australia

Yandeyarra
- Town
- Coordinates: 21.282°0′S 118.401°0′E
- Country: Australia
- State: Western Australia
- LGA: Town of Port Hedland
- Location: 100 km (62 mi) south of Port Hedland

Government
  - State electorate: Pilbara
  - Federal division: Durack
- Postcode: 6721
- Mean max temp: 33.2 °C (91.8 °F)
- Mean min temp: 19.4 °C (66.9 °F)
- Annual rainfall: 309.1 mm (12.17 in)

Yandeyarra (also referred to as Mugarinya) is a large Aboriginal community, located in the Pilbara region of Western Australia, within the Town of Port Hedland.

== History ==
Yandeyarra was established in 1964 and has a population of approximately 400 people. The community is located within the Yandeyarra pastoral station. The original buildings on the site formed an outstation of the original pastoral station.

In January 2019, over 1,000 cattle died on Yandeyarra Reserve, including 760 which were euthanised after being found in poor health. The Mugarinya Community Association Inc. and eight associated individuals were charged with multiple counts of animal cruelty in January 2021. In December 2023, the Mugarinya Community Association pleaded guilty to animal cruelty and was fined $50,000. As part of a pre-trial agreement, the charges against individuals associated with the deaths were dropped and the association agreed to reimburse the Department of Primary Industries and Regional Development nearly $500,000 in costs associated with the cattle's deaths.

== Native title ==
The community is located within the registered Kariyarra people (WAD6169/1998) native title claim area.

== Education ==
Children of school age at Yandeyarra attend the Yandeyarra Remote Community School. The school caters for years K – 12 with approximately 40 students enrolled.

== Town planning ==
Yandeyarra Layout Plan No.1 has been prepared in accordance with State Planning Policy 3.2 Aboriginal Settlements. Layout Plan No.1 was endorsed by the community on 6 July 2001 and the Western Australian Planning Commission on 1 August 2001.
