= International Society of Surgery =

- Abbreviation: ISS
- Formation: 1902
- Location: Zurich, Switzerland

The International Society of Surgery, or the Société Internationale de Chirurgie, is an international society of surgeons founded in 1902.

It contributes to raising awareness of accessing surgery worldwide.

The International Society of Surgery (ISS) transferred its home office from Brussels to Basle (Switzerland) in 1986, and in 2016 to Zurich. The ISS/SIC is organising its biannual meeting by touring world wide rotating between EMEA, Asia/Pacific and the Americas. Ari Leppäniemi is the current president and Kenneth Boffard Secretary General.

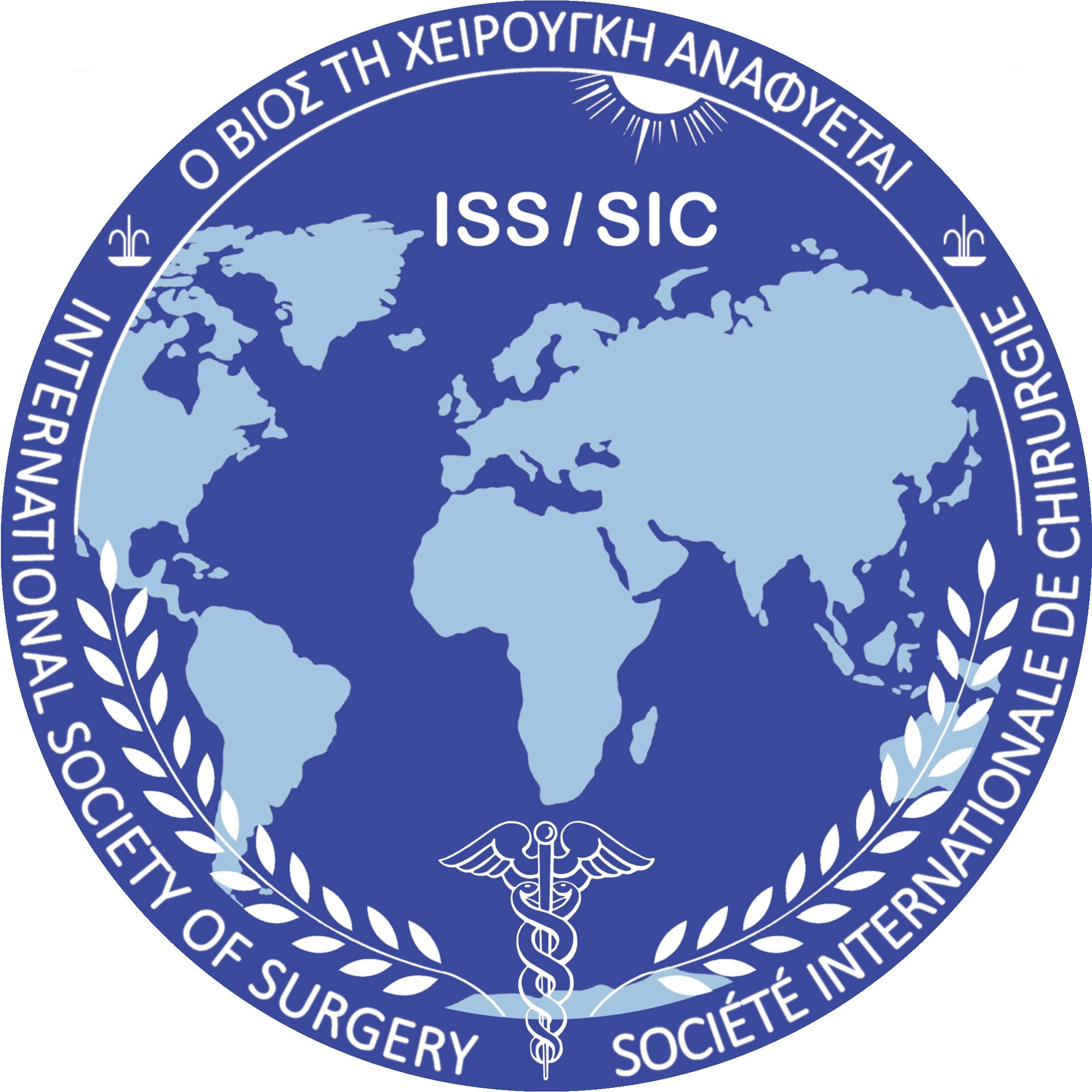
