= Don McLeod (activist) =

Australian activist

Donald William McLeod (1908 - 1999) was an Australian activist best known for his role in the Pilbara strike.

== Biography ==
McLeod was born on 8 May 1908 in the remote gold-mining town of Meekatharra, Western Australia. He was the son of Hannah Jane (née Morrison) and William Henry McLeod.

McLeod grew up in Geraldton and attended the Presentation Convent at Greenough, where there was an attempt to impose Catholicism on him. He worked as a manual labourer at various places across Western Australia. While working, he began to develop relationships with the Aboriginal people of the area.

In 1932 he established an asbestos mine in the Ashburton District. He later worked at a mine nearby Marble Bar, and then as a worker on various minor infrastructure contracts.

During World War II he was a member of the anti-fascist league, which led to his interest in socialism. He became a member of the Australian Communist Party. He became a delegate for the Australian Workers' Union in Port Hedland. He stood unsuccessfully for the state seat of Pilbara at the 1943 Western Australian state election, running as a "progressive Labor independent".

In 1946, at the beginning of the Pilbara strike, McLeod was chosen as an intermediary between the strikers and the authorities. McLeod became directly involved in the Pilbara strike during its second year, in mid-1948 when he relocated again to Marble Bar. After the conclusion of the strike, McLeod became an adviser to around 800 aboriginal workers, assisting them to maintain their living through alluvial mining; allowing them to avoid returning to work as employees for pastoralists. By the late 1940s McLeod had been in and out of jail several times due to his associations with the strike and his relationships with the Aboriginal strikers.

In the 1950s, McLeod campaigned against restriction on Aboriginal peoples' movement below the 20th parallel.

In 1980, McLeod became involved with the Noonkanbah land rights controversy.

He died at the age of 90, still working for the community associated with the strikers. He died a pauper. He was buried in the Pilbara, at Strelley Station.
