= Bill Dunn (Pilbara elder) =

Indigenous Australian pastoralist

Bill and Maureen Dunn on their wedding day, 1963

William Dunn OAM (born 1911) was an Indigenous Australian pastoralist and elder from the Pilbara region of Western Australia (WA).

Dunn was the first Aboriginal person to be granted a cattle station lease in WA. His experience has been drawn upon by historians as an account of Aboriginal Australian experience in the 20th century, especially around the Pilbara. In his later years, he was an elder of the Jigalong community.

Dunn's role as a pastoralist was unusual at the time for an Indigenous Australian, an issue caused by systemic racism and legal discriminations. This included his status as an experienced stock manager in the Marble Bar area, and his obtaining of a pastoral lease in the 1960s. He was also directly involved in the landmark 1946 Pilbara strike.

Dunn was awarded the Medal of the Order of Australia (OAM) in the 1991 Queen's Birthday Honours "for services to the community, particularly the Aboriginal community." His biography was written by Graham Wilson and published in 1989.

== Early life ==
Dunn was born in 1911 to a European father and an Indigenous mother. His maternal heritage belonged to the Martukaja community. His biological father was involved in mining, and never recognised Dunn as his offspring. He was raised by an indigenous step-father, along with European miners from the East Pilbara goldfields. By the time he was ten, he had already become a skilled drover.

== 1920s to 1970s ==
=== Efforts to obtain pastoral lease ===
At around thirty years old and contemporaneous to the outbreak of World War II, Dunn made an application to the Western Australia Lands Department for a 300,000-acre (120,000 ha) pastoral lease around Mount Divide, Nullagine. To succeed, he needed to obtain an exemption from the Native Administration Act, a bill that legally segregated Aboriginal Australians by race. He also needed no objections to be raised against his application.

Dunn successfully obtained an exemption in 1939 on the grounds that he was "an Aboriginal native of good character". Nevertheless, his application was blocked by objections raised by neighbouring pastoralists; objections raised for political reasons involving racism. After the rejection, he returned to station work as a stockman and joined the Volunteer Defence Force, where he was made an officer.

=== Citizenship ===
Dunn obtained an Australian citizenship certificate under the Western Australian Natives (Citizenship Rights) Act 1944. This Act allowed Aboriginal Australians to acquire full citizenship rights, on the condition that they could prove that they were "an Aboriginal native of good character". This act was derisively described by Aboriginal Australians as the "dog collar" act, and certificates a "dog licence".

=== Other work ===
Dunn was directly involved in the landmark 1946 Pilbara strike, an action by Indigenous pastoral workers in pursuit of their rights, with his account forming a part of the historical record.

In the 1960s, Dunn was able to obtain a station of his own. He was assisted in the process by some friends, including fellow pastoralists and an Australian police officer who went into a legal partnership with him in the business in an effort to evade some forms of discrimination. In substance, however, Dunn was the sole operator and owner of the business. He became the first Indigenous Australian to obtain a pastoral lease in Western Australia. This first range was so successful that he was later able to obtain a second station near Jigalong named 'Robertson Range'.

Dunn was known for providing assistance to explorers of the region, including geologists. He was a part of the first attempt to cross the Great Sandy Desert by motorised transport.

== Later life ==
In the early 1980s, Dunn was too elderly to run both of his stations. His Mount Divide station was sold and he moved to his 'Robertson Range' station near Jigalong. In his later years, he was a member of the Jigalong community. During this period, he became friends with Graham Wilson, an Australian who later authored his biographical account, Pilbara Bushman: The Life Experience of W. Dunn. When his other station also became too difficult to manage, he sold it to the traditional owners of the area for half the market price despite full-price offers from persons outside the community.

== Personal life ==
Dunn married Maureen Dunn, a fellow Aboriginal Australian at Nullagine's Riverdale Hostel in 1963 through a church ceremony. Their marriage was somewhat controversial within the Indigenous community, as their coupling was not allowed under the relevant kinship laws. They had two sons, Andrew and Noel.

== See also ==
- Australian frontier wars
- List of Indigenous Australian historical figures
