= List of radio station callsigns in Western Australia =

The following is a list of Australian radio station callsigns beginning with the number 6, indicating radio stations in the state of Western Australia.

Callsign	Area served	Frequency	Band	On-air ID	Purpose	Site
6AAY	Albany	095.3	FM	Hit Albany	Commercial	
6ABCCT	Western Australia	various	FM	ABC Country	National	
6ABCFM	Western Australia	various	FM	ABC Classic	National	
6ABCGS	Western Australia	various	FM	ABC Sport	National	
6ABCRN	Western Australia	various	FM	Radio National	National	
6ABCRR	Western Australia	various	FM	ABC Local Radio	National	
6ACR	Remote Aboriginal communities	various	FM	National Indigenous Radio Service	Community	
6AL	Albany	0630	AM	ABC Great Southern	National	
6AM	Northam	0864	AM	Radio West	Commercial	
6AUG	Augusta	097.1	FM	2oceansFM	Community	
6BAY	Geraldton	098.1	FM	Triple M	Commercial	
6BE	Broome	0675	AM	ABC Kimberley	National	
6BET	Bridgetown	100.5	FM	Hit Southwest	Commercial	
6BR	Bridgetown	1044	AM	ABC South West	National	
6BS	Busselton / Bunbury	0684	AM	ABC South West	National	
6BUN	Bunbury	095.7	FM	Hit Southwest	Commercial	
6BY	Bridgetown	0900	AM	Radio West	Commercial	
6CA	Carnarvon	0846	AM	ABC Pilbara	National	
6CAR	Carnarvon	099.7	FM	Hit 99.7 Carnarvon	Commercial	
6CCR	Fremantle	107.9	FM	Radio Fremantle	Community	
6CKI	Cocos Islands	096	FM	6CKI	Community	
6CRA	Albany	100.9	FM	4ufm	Community	
6CST	Mandurah	097.3	FM	Coast FM	Commercial	
6DB	Derby	0873	AM	ABC Kimberley	National	
6DBY	Derby	097.9	FM	6DBY	Community	
6DL	Dalwallinu	0531	AM	ABC Mid West & Wheatbelt	National	
6EBA	Perth	095.3	FM	6EBA	Community	
6ED	Esperance	0837	AM	ABC Esperance	National	
6EL	Bunbury	0621	AM	SEN Spirit	Commercial	
6ESP	Esperance	103.9	FM	Hope FM	Community	
6FMS	Remote Commercial Radio Service Western Zone	various	FM	Hit WA Was RED FM	Commercial	
6FX	Fitzroy Crossing	0936	AM	Wangki Yupurnanupurru Radio	Community	
6GF	Kalgoorlie	0648	AM	ABC Goldfields	National	
6GGG	Geraldton	096.5	FM	Hit 96.5	Commercial	
6GME	Broome	099.7	FM	Radio Goolarri	Community	
6GN	Geraldton	0828	AM	ABC Mid West & Wheatbelt	National	
6HCR	Port Hedland	101.3	FM	101.3 FM	Community	
6HED	Port Hedland	091.7	FM	Hit 91.7 Port Hedland	Commercial	
6HFM	Armadale	107.3	FM	HFM	Community	
6HRV	Harvey	096.5	FM	96.5 FM	Community	
6IX	Perth	1080	AM	6iX	Commercial	
6JJJ	Western Australia	various	FM	Triple J	National	
6KA	Karratha	102.5	FM	Triple M	Commercial	
6KAN	Katanning	094.9	FM	Hit Great Southern	Commercial	
6KAR	Kalgoorlie	097.9	FM	Hit Goldfields	Commercial	
6KCR	Kalamunda	102.5	FM	KCR	Community	
6 kg	Kalgoorlie	0981	AM	Radio West	Commercial	
6KP	Karratha	0702	AM	ABC Pilbara	National	
6KW	Kununurra	0819	AM	ABC Kimberley	National	
6LN	Carnarvon	0666	AM	Classic Hits 666	Commercial	
6MD	Merredin	1098	AM	Radio West	Commercial	
6MER	Merredin	105.1	FM	Hit Wheatbelt	Commercial	
6MIX	Perth	094.5	FM	Mix 94.5	Commercial	
6MJ	Manjimup	0738	AM	ABC South West	National	
6MKA	Meekatharra	098.3	FM	Meeka FM	Community	
6MM	Mandurah	91.7	FM	91.7 The Wave	Commercial	
6MMM	Perth	092.9	FM	Triple M	Commercial	
6MN	Newman	0567	AM	ABC Pilbara	National	
6NA	Narrogin	0918	AM	Radio West	Commercial	
6NAM	Northam	096.5	FM	Hit Wheatbelt	Commercial	
6NAN	Narrogin	100.5	FM	Hit Great Southern	Commercial	
6NEW	Newman	092.9	FM	6NEW	Community	
6NM	Northam	1215	AM	ABC Mid West & Wheatbelt	National	
6NME	Perth	100.9	FM	Noongar Radio	Community	
6NOW	Perth	096.1	FM	96FM	Commercial	
6NR	Perth	100.1	FM	Curtin Radio	Community	
6NW	Port Hedland	94.1	FM	Triple M	Commercial	
6PAC	Kalgoorlie	096.3	FM	Tjuma 96.3	Community	
6PB	Western Australia	various	AM	ABC NewsRadio	National	
6PER	Perth	093.7	FM	Nova 93.7	Commercial	
6PH	Port Hedland	0603	AM	ABC Pilbara	National	
6PN	Pannawonica	0567	AM	ABC Pilbara	National	
6PNN	Western Australia	various	FM	ABC NewsRadio	National	
6PR	Perth	0882	AM	6PR	Commercial	
6PRK	Halls Creek	098.1	FM	6PRK	Community	
6PU	Paraburdoo	0567	AM	ABC Pilbara	National	
6RCI	Christmas Island	105.3 & 102.1	FM	6RCI	Community	
6RED	Karratha	106.5	FM	hit Karratha	Commercial	
6RN	Western Australia	various	AM	Radio National	National	
6RTR	Perth	092.1	FM	RTR FM	Community	
6SAT	Remote Commercial Radio Service Western Zone	various	FM	Triple M	Commercial	
6SBSCH	Western Australia	various	FM	SBS Chill	National	
6SBSFM	Western Australia	various	FM	SBS Radio	National	
6SE	Esperance	0747	AM	Radio West	Commercial	
6SEA	Esperance	102.3	FM	Hit 102.3 Esperance	Commercial	
6SEN	Perth	101.7	FM	Capital Community Radio	Community	
6SON	Perth	098.5	FM	Sonshine FM	Community	
6TCR	Wanneroo	089.7	FM	89.7 FM	Community	
6TP	Tom Price	0567	AM	ABC Pilbara	National	
6TZ	Bunbury	0963	AM	Radio West	Commercial	
6VA	Albany	0783	AM	Radio West	Commercial	
6WA	Wagin	0558	AM	ABC Great Southern	National	
6WB	Katanning	1071	AM	Radio West	Commercial	
6WF	Perth	0720	AM	ABC Perth	National	
6WH	Wyndham	1017	AM	ABC Kimberley	National	
6WR	Kununurra	0693	AM	6WR	Community	
6WSM	Fremantle	091.3	FM	Sport FM	Community	
6XM	Exmouth	1188	AM	ABC Pilbara	National	
6YCR	York	101.3	FM	Voice of the Avon	Community	

== Defunct callsigns ==
Callsign	Area served	Frequency	Band	Fate	Freq currently	Purpose
6AR	Perth	1170	AM	Moved to FM in 2003, retained call	silent	Community
6AR	Perth	100.9	FM	Shut down in 2007	6NME	Community
6BY	Bunbury	980	AM	Shut down in 1935		Commercial
6CI	Collie	1134	AM	Became repeater of 6TZ, Nov 1996	6TZ Collie	Commercial
6GE	Geraldton	1008	AM	Moved to FM in 1991 as 6GGG		Commercial
6GL	Perth	1080	AM	Callsign of 6IX between 1988 and 1991	6IX	Commercial
6JKY	Perth	094.5	FM	Changed call to 66MIX in 1998	6MIX	Commercial
6KY	Perth	1206	AM	Moved to FM in 1991 as 6JKY	6TAB (HPON)	Commercial
6ML	Perth	1130	AM	Closed May 1943	6TZ Collie	Commercial
6NR	Perth	0927	AM	Moved to FM in 2002, retained call	silent	Community
6PCR	Fremantle	091.3	FM	Shut down in 2008	6WSM	Community
6PM	Perth	0990	AM	Moved to FM in 1991 as 6PPM	TCBL (Vision Australia Radio)	Commercial
6PPM	Perth	092.9	FM	Changed call to 6MMM in 2020	6MMM	Commercial
6RPH	Perth	0990	AM	Shut down in 2015	TCBL (Vision Australia Radio)	Community
6TTT	Geraldton	097.3	FM	Shut down in 2011	silent	Community
6UVS	Perth	092.1	FM	Changed call to 6RTR in 1991	6RTR	Community
6UWA	Perth	092.1	FM	Changed call to 6UVS in 1979	see 6UVS	Community
6WN	Perth	0810	AM	Changed call to 6RN in 1991	6RN	National
6YMS	Perth	101.7	FM	Shut down in 2008	6SEN	Community

== Defunct Short Wave callsigns ==
Callsign	Area served	Frequency (MHz)	Band	Fate	Freq currently	Purpose
6ME	International	031 metres	SW	Early 1930s to 1939	silent	National
VLW6	Remote Western Australia	06.14	SW	Shut down in the 1980s	silent	National
VLW9	Remote Western Australia	09.61	SW	Shut down in the 1980s	silent	National
VLW15	Remote Western Australia	15.425	SW	Shut down in the 1980s	silent	National
VLX	Remote Western Australia	60 metres	SW	1949+, Shut down in the 1980s?	silent	National
