= 6RED =

- Karratha, Western Australia; Australia
- Broadcast area: Karratha RA1 ()
- Frequency: 106.5 MHz FM
- Branding: Red FM

Programming
- Language: English
- Format: Top 40 (CHR)
- Affiliations: WAFM

Ownership
- Owner: West Australian Newspapers Ltd; (North West Radio Pty Ltd)
- Sister stations: 6KA

History
- First air date: November 3, 1997

Technical information
- ERP: 1,000 watts
- HAAT: 165 m (541 ft)
- Transmitter coordinates: 20°44′57″S 116°49′55″E

Links
- Website: Official website

6RED, branded on-air as Red FM, is an Australian radio station owned by Seven West Media. The station serves Karratha, Western Australia.
