= NPFL =

NPFL is the name of:

- National Patriotic Front of Liberia, a rebel group in the First Liberian Civil War
- National Pro Fastpitch League, professional women's softball league in the US
- Nigeria Premier Football League, the highest level of the Nigerian football league system
- North Pilbara Football League, an Australian rules football competition in Western Australia
