= WAFM =

WAFM could refer to:

- WAFM (Australia), a radio station network serving the North West of Western Australia
- WAFM (United States), a radio station (95.7 FM) licensed to Amory, Mississippi, United States
- WVTM-TV, formerly known as WAFM-TV, Birmingham, Alabama, United States
