= Reenita Hora =

Indian-American author

Reenita Malhotra Hora
- Writing career
- Notable awards: Eric Hoffer Book Award Chanticleer International Book Awards Santa Barbara International Screenplay Awards
- Website: Reenita Hora

Reenita M. Hora is an Indian–American writer. She won the Eric Hoffer Book Award Grand Prize and Chanticleer International Book Awards. She also won the 2023 Santa Barbara International Screenplay Awards for her book "Operation Mom".

== Early life and education ==
Hora was born in Mumbai, India.

She pursued her higher education in the United States.

== Career ==
Hora worked for SRI International as head of marketing.

She also served as the VP of Content at hibooks/Otto Radio.

Hora was a presenter and producer for Bloomberg and received an award for hosting at RTHK Radio 3 in Hong Kong.

Hora also built and sold her startup Ayoma.

She has authored seven books, comprising both non-fiction and fiction works.

Her writings have been featured in The Wall Street Journal, The Hindu, The New York Times, South China Morning Post, CNN, among others.

== Books ==
- Operation Mom: How I Got My Mom a Life... and a Man
- Ayurveda: A Holistic Approach to Health
- When Arya Fell through the Fault
- Inner Beauty: Discover Natural Beauty and Well-Being with the Traditions of Ayurveda
- Forever Young: Unleashing the Magic of Ayurveda
- The Ayurvedic Diet
- Money Smart: The Indian Woman's Guide to Managing Wealth
