= 567 AM =

AM radio frequency

The following radio stations broadcast on AM frequency 567 kHz:

== Australia ==
- 4JK in Julia Creek, Queensland (ABC Queensland)
- 6TP in Mount Tom Price, Western Australia (ABC Western Australia)
- 6MN in Mount Newman, Western Australia (ABC Western Australia)
- 6PU in Paraburdoo, Western Australia (ABC Western Australia)
- 6PN in Pannawonica, Western Australia (ABC Western Australia)
- 2BH in Broken Hill, New South Wales

== China ==
- CNR-1 in Lianyungang
- RTHK Radio 3 at Hong Kong

== India ==
- All India Radio NE, Dibrugarh

== Japan ==
- JOIK in Sapporo

== Laos ==
- LNR Radio 1 in Vientiane

== New Zealand ==
- RNZ National in Wellington

== South Africa ==
- 567 Cape Talk in Cape Town

== South Korea ==
- HLKF in Jeonju (KBS)

== United States ==
Call sign	City of license	Facility ID	Class	Day kW	Night kW	Transmitter coordinates
KGUM	Agana, Guam	60853	B	10	10	13.391111°N 144.761667°E

== Defunct ==
- RTÉ Radio 1 in Tullamore, Ireland
- Radio Multikulti in Germany
