= Wangki =

Wangki may refer to:

- Wangki Radio, a radio station in Fitzroy Crossing, Western Australia
- Wangki Lowang, Indian politician
