= 1215 AM =

AM radio frequency

The following radio stations broadcast on AM frequency 1215 kHz:

== Australia ==
- ABC Midwest & Wheatbelt, only Midwest broadcasts at 1215 kHz.

== China ==
- CNR Radio The Greater Bay

== Philippines ==
- DYRF-AM, also known as Radio Fuerza, is a radio station in The Philippines that broadcasts at 1215 kHz.

== Defunct ==
- Absolute Radio in the United Kingdom
