= Radio 3 =

Radio 3 may refer to:

- BBC Radio 3, British radio station
- CBC Radio 3, Canadian radio station
- NPO 3FM, Dutch radio station
- Polskie Radio Program III, Polish radio station
- Rai Radio 3, Italian radio station
- Radio 3 (Spanish radio station) (Radio 3 RNE)
- RTHK Radio 3, Hong Kong radio station
- Radio 3, the former name of Singaporean Chinese-language radio station Capital 958

== See also ==
- Radyo 3, Turkish radio station
