= Red FM =

The name Red FM refers to more than one radio station:

- CKYE-FM (93.1 MHz), branded as Red FM, in Surrey, British Columbia, Canada
- Cork's Red FM ILR (104.5-106.1 MHz), an Irish radio station which broadcasts to Cork and the surrounding area
- Red FM (Australia), a commercial radio network covering the remote areas of Western Australia
- Red FM (India) (93.5 MHz), an Indian radio brand with stations broadcasting at 93.5 MHz across the country
- Red FM (Malaysia) (104.9 MHz)
- Red FM (Greece) (96.3 MHz)
