= Cyclone Damien =

Category 2 Australian region cyclone in 2020

Severe Tropical Cyclone Damien
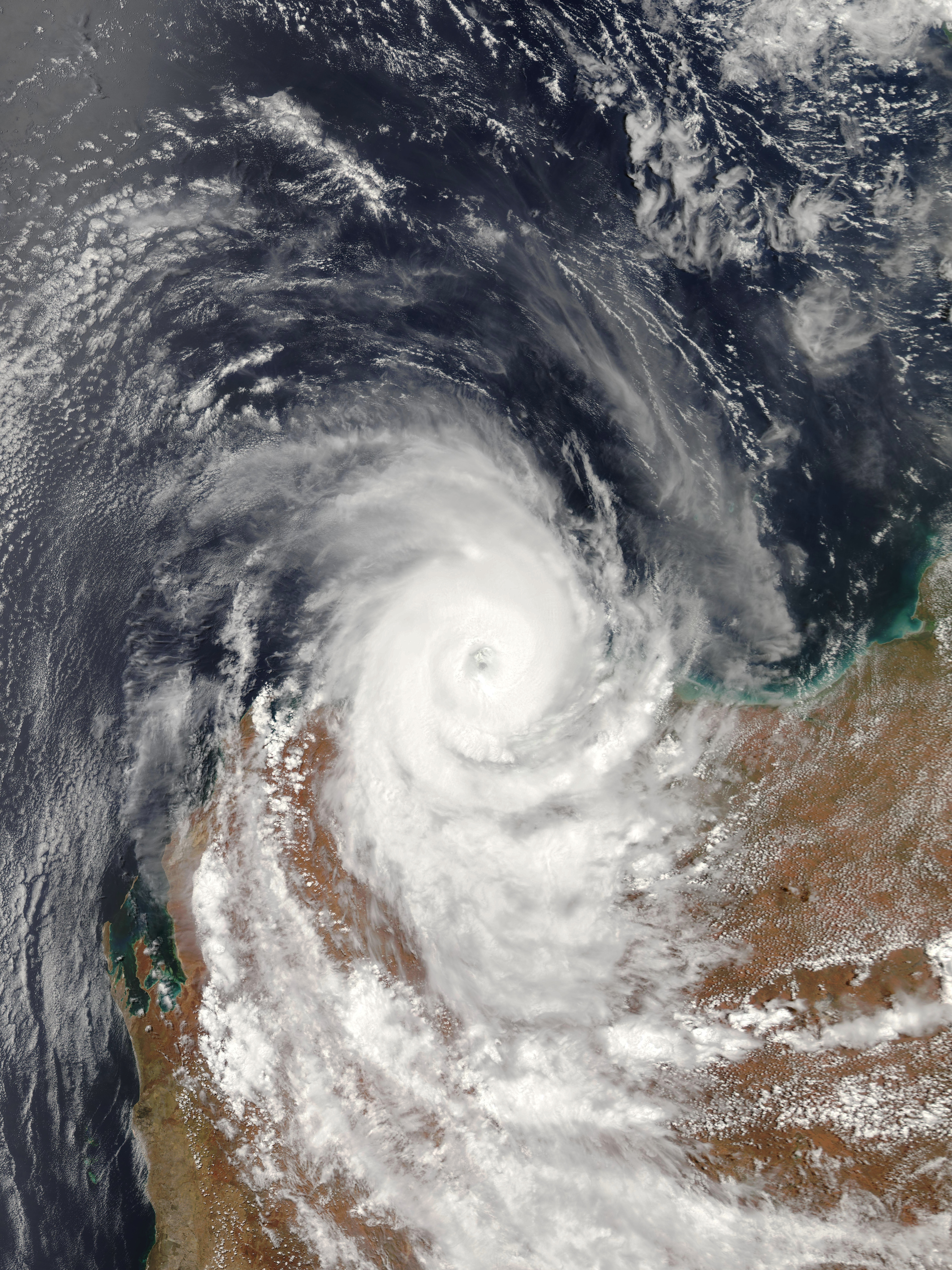
- Cyclone Damien at peak intensity prior to landfall on 8 February

Meteorological history
- Formed: 3 February 2020
- Dissipated: 9 February 2020

Category 3 severe tropical cyclone
- 10-minute sustained (Aus)
- Highest winds: 155 km/h (100 mph)
- Highest gusts: 220 km/h (140 mph)
- Lowest pressure: 955 hPa (mbar); 28.20 inHg

Category 2-equivalent tropical cyclone
- 1-minute sustained (SSHWS/JTWC)
- Highest winds: 175 km/h (110 mph)
- Lowest pressure: 956 hPa (mbar); 28.23 inHg

Overall effects
- Fatalities: None
- Damage: A$6 million (US$4,000,000 in 2020)
- Areas affected: Western Australia
- IBTrACS
- Part of the 2019–20 Australian region cyclone season

Severe Tropical Cyclone Damien was the strongest cyclone to make landfall on the Western Australian coast since Cyclone Christine in 2013 and the second-strongest cyclone in the 2019–20 Australian region cyclone season after Cyclone Ferdinand. The fifth tropical low, and the third named storm of the 2019–20 Australian region cyclone season, Damien originated from a monsoon trough over Kimberley.

As a monsoon trough began developing over parts of the Kimberley on 2 February 2020, the BOM noted that an inland tropical disturbance formed over the Northern Territory, within the monsoon trough. On 4 February, it exited land and emerged over the eastern Indian Ocean, and the JTWC named the disturbance Invest 92S. A Tropical Cyclone Formation Alert was issued early the following day by the JTWC as convection began to steadily develop near the center. The next day, the JTWC issued its first advisory on the system as a tropical storm. Many hours later, the BOM followed suit, upgrading the tropical storm to a Category 1 cyclone and giving it the name Damien.

In preparation for Damien, the Australian Bureau of Meteorology issued a red alert from Whim Creek to Mardie going all the way south to Millstream Chichester National Park and a yellow alert from Port Hedland to Whim Creek stretching southwards to Wittenoom. Evacuation centers were set up in Karratha, and South Hedland. A search and rescue team was also stationed in Port Hedland. Damien brought gale-force winds, heavy-extreme/torrential rain, and extreme floods to Western Australia when it made landfall close to Karratha on 8 February. Wind gusts exceeding 205 km/h (125 mph) were recorded close to the landfall point. Over 230 mm (9.1 in) of rain fell in Karratha and Roebourne from 8–9 February 2020. Around 9,500 people in Pilbara lost power. Besides downed power lines, strong winds also uprooted many trees and caused many buildings to lose their roofs. Karratha Airport was forced to close on the morning of 10 February 2020 after the terminal sustained damage and lost power.

== Meteorological history ==
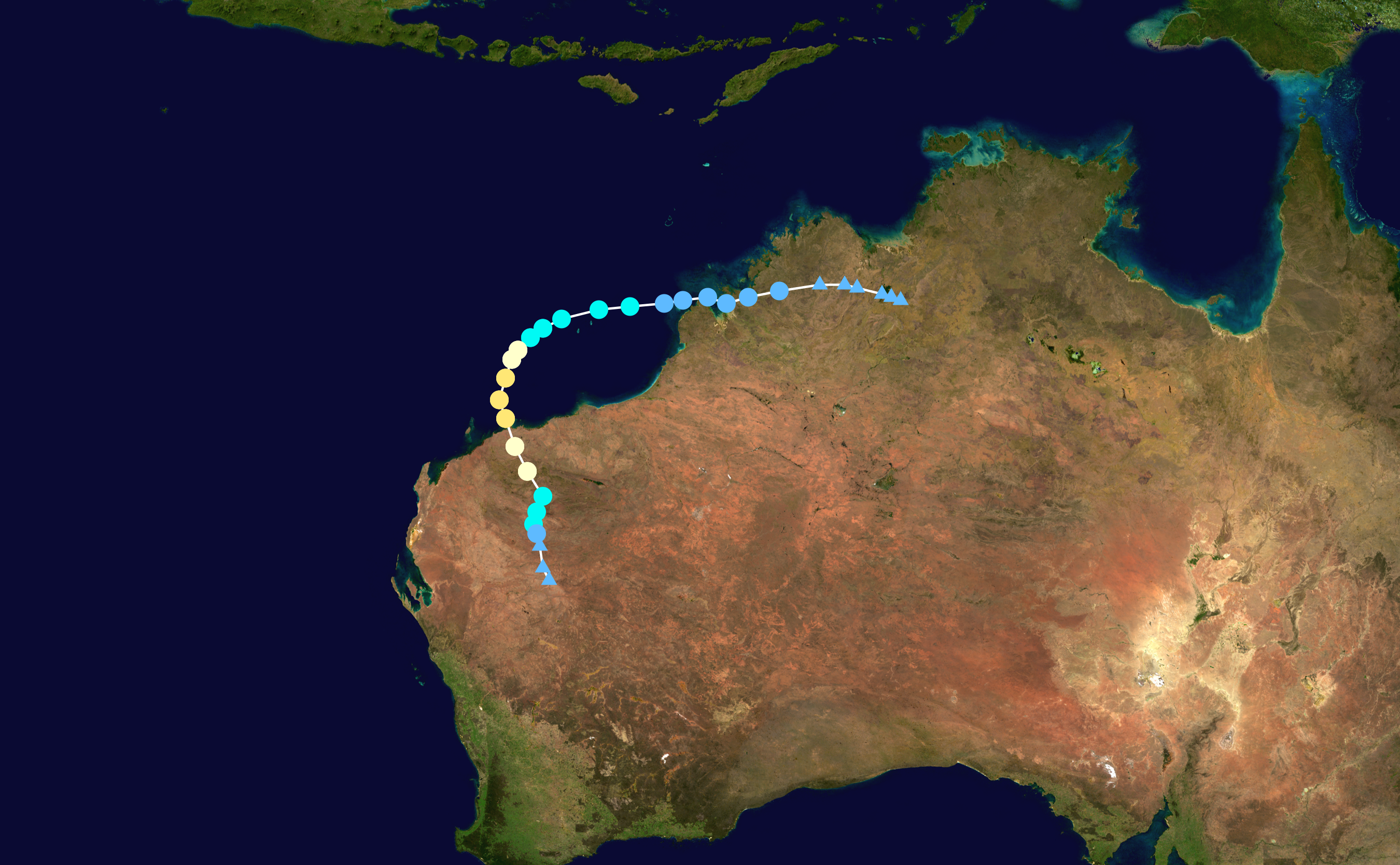
Map plotting the storm's track and intensity, according to the Saffir–Simpson scale Map key Saffir–Simpson scale Tropical depression (≤38 mph, ≤62 km/h) Tropical storm (39–73 mph, 63–118 km/h) Category 1 (74–95 mph, 119–153 km/h) Category 2 (96–110 mph, 154–177 km/h) Category 3 (111–129 mph, 178–208 km/h) Category 4 (130–156 mph, 209–251 km/h) Category 5 (≥157 mph, ≥252 km/h) Unknown Storm type Tropical cyclone Subtropical cyclone Extratropical cyclone, remnant low, tropical disturbance, or monsoon depression

As a monsoon trough began to develop over parts of the Kimberley on 2 February 2020, the BOM noted that an inland tropical disturbance formed over the Northern Territory, within the monsoon trough. On 4 February, it exited land and emerged over the eastern Indian Ocean, and the JTWC named the disturbance as Invest 92S. A Tropical Cyclone Formation Alert was issued early the following day by the JTWC as convection began to steadily develop near the center. The next day, the JTWC issued its first advisory on the system as a tropical storm. Many hours later, the BOM followed suit, upgrading the tropical storm to a Category 1 cyclone and giving it the name Damien. Damien began tracking south, later intensifying to a powerful category 2 cyclone, later Damien tracks a little to the west, with it quickly changing its track a little to the east while going south, soon it made landfall in the Pilbara region of Western Australia, with winds peak winds of 160 km/h (100 mph), Damien kept tracking west before again moving a little west and quickly dissipating.

== Preparations ==
In preparation for Damien, the Australian Bureau of Meteorology issued a red alert from Whim Creek to Mardie going all the way south to Millstream Chichester National Park, and a yellow alert from Port Hedland to Whim Creek stretching southwards to Wittenoom. Evacuation centers were set up in Karratha, and South Hedland. A search and rescue team was also stationed in Port Hedland. Ports of Port Hedland, Dampier, and Ashburton were closed on Friday. Alongside 20 schools, high schools and learning centers in the region Residents in Pilbara rushed to get their hands on supplies after cities and towns were placed on blue alert, leaving supermarkets shelves empty of freshwater and food.

== Impacts ==
Damien brought gale-force winds, heavy-extreme/torrential rain, and extreme floods to Western Australia when it made landfall close to Karratha on 8 February. Wind gusts exceeding 205 km/h (125 mph) were recorded close to the landfall point. Over 230 mm (9.1 in) of rain fell in Karratha and Roebourne from 8–9 February. Around 9,500 people in Pilbara lost power. Besides downed power lines, strong winds also uprooted many trees and caused many buildings to lose their roofs. The local airport's roof was damaged by uprooted trees, resulting in water leakage into the building, the police station was also damaged by flooding. The Bureau of Meteorology's Dampier radar sustained significant damage due to Damien and was replaced with a Vaisala WRM200. Extensive vegetation damage was reported and there was some damage to property. Damages in Karratha totaled up to $6 million.

== Cleanup ==
After Cyclone Damien, Karratha coordinated cleanup and relief efforts across cities and towns affected by the cyclone.

== Retirement ==
Later in 2020, the Bureau of Meteorology retired the name Damien due to the damage caused by the storm in Western Australia. It will be replaced by Declan in future seasons.

== See also ==
- Tropical cyclones in 2020
- Other storms named Damien
- Cyclone Veronica (2019) – A powerful tropical cyclone that had a track similar to Damien
