= List of storms named Damien =

The name Damien has been used for three tropical cyclones in the Australian region of the Southern Hemisphere.

- Cyclone Damien (1987) – a category 2 tropical cyclone near Western Australia.
- Cyclone Damien (1999) – a Category 3 severe tropical cyclone (Australian scale), mostly stayed at sea.
- Cyclone Damien (2020) – was the strongest cyclone to make landfall in the Western Australian coast since Cyclone Christine in 2013.
