= 6AR =

Former radio station in Perth, Western Australia

- Perth, Western Australia; Australia

Programming
- Format: Defunct

Ownership
- Owner: Western Australian Aboriginal Media Association

History
- First air date: 1994
- Former call signs: 100.9fm, 1170am

6AR was a community radio station based in Perth, Western Australia. It was operated by the Western Australian Aboriginal Media Association and was on air between 1994 and 2006.

== Early history ==
=== WAAMA ===
The Western Australian Aboriginal Media Association (WAAMA) was founded in 1988 as an Aboriginal corporation with the aim of promoting Aboriginal culture. WAAMA provided programming for a number of media outlets, most notably the Australian Broadcasting Corporation and 6NR.

=== Broadcasters ===
Mark Bin Bakar, better known for his alter-ego Mary G, was an early WAAMA announcer. In the late 1990s Narelda Jacobs, currently a news anchor with Network Ten, was a broadcaster with 6AR.

== Broadcasting ==
Radio 6AR was launched in 1994 and broadcast from facilities in Wellington Street, Perth. The station initially broadcast on the AM band at 1170 kHz. As well as providing news and music programming, 6AR broadcast a range of sporting programs including syndicated AFL and NRL coverage through the National Indigenous Radio Service. They were represented at the 2000 Olympics in Sydney.

== Other announcers ==
Other announcers who had over five year tenures at both 1170 6AR and 100.9fm were:

- Jeff Michael (who currently still holds a position at the new 100.9fm)
- Joel Thomas – known for hard-hitting Aboriginal rights stories, founder of the "Noongar Nights" program
- Richard Williams – news writer, reader and show host
- Bevan Rankins – represented 1170 6AR at the 2000 Sydney Olympic games as a journalist and Deadly award winner for his 15-year role at WAAMA
- James Rossi – sports breakfast presenter, best known as one of the youngest breakfast announcers in WA radio history at 15 years old
- Claire Thomas – breakfast show host, currently a sports reporter for Channel 10 Perth
- Michael Narrier – weekend request, news reader and current South Australian radio host

Other on-air staff included:

- Errol Binder
- Peter Rowe
- Storme Brenton
- Marty Young
- Michael Holland
- Paul Holland
- Jim Beam (Errol Battersby)
- Tina Pantelis
- Colin Minson
- Percy Johnson
- Alan "Chubby" Stiles
- Ted Wishart

In 2003 6AR moved to the FM band and broadcast from 100.9 MHz. Shortly after the move to FM the station rebranded as a country music station with less focus on Aboriginal culture.

== Cancellation of licence ==
In May 2006 the Australian Communications and Media Authority (ACMA) conducted an investigation into 6AR and found that the station had breached their licence conditions. ACMA found that between August 2003 and April 2005 conditions relating to providing Aboriginal programming were not met.

In September 2006 6AR ceased broadcasting and the Office of the Registrar of Aboriginal Corporations began proceedings to wind up WAAMA. The Australian newspaper raised the issue of the October 2005 transfer of the station's premises to a private company and the subsequent lease back to WAAMA.

In November 2006 ACMA cancelled 6AR's licence for failing to comply with licence conditions added as a result of the May 2006 findings.

ACMA in January 2008 allocated the vacant 100.9 FM frequency to a group led by Peedac Pty Ltd who proposed a replacement Aboriginal radio service for Perth, 6NME.
