= ABC Kimberley =

Australia
- Broadcast area: Kimberley region, Christmas Island and Cocos (Keeling) Islands.
- Frequency: 675 kHz AM

Programming
- Format: Talk

Ownership
- Owner: Australian Broadcasting Corporation

History
- First air date: 1990

Technical information
- Transmitter coordinates: 17°57′15.18″S 122°14′24.18″E

Links
- Website: www.abc.net.au/kimberley/

ABC Kimberley is an ABC Local Radio station based in Broome, Western Australia, and broadcasting to the Kimberley region. This includes towns of Kununurra, Halls Creek, Derby and Fitzroy Crossing. The station also broadcast to the Australian External territories of Cocos (Keeling) Islands and Christmas Island. It is owned by the Australian Broadcasting Corporation.

Its callsign is 6BE and it transmits on AM.

== History ==
Before 1986, the ABC did not have any presence in the north west of Western Australia, until the construction of 6KP Karratha. As a result, the ABC realised no presence had been created in the Kimberley, and thus plans were made to trial a twelve-month ABC station based in Broome broadcasting to the region.

The station officially opened on 26 January 1990, with sole employee George Manning broadcasting from a small back-studio on 14 Napier Terrace in Broome. After the station's success, the station became a permanent broadcasting facility in 1991. In 1994 plans were made to find a new presenter to present the Kimberley Mornings program, and Desiree Sutherland, fresh out of an ABC cadetship in Sydney, got the job. More staff joined through the years, and the station assisted in creating Aboriginal community radio stations across the Kimberley.

In 1997, a new outpost administered by Broome was established in the East Kimberley town of Kununurra. The studio was located in a back bedroom on a house at 14 Sandalwood Street. Greg Hayes was the debutant reporter based there, before Matt Brann took over the reins in 2007. While the Broome studio was sturdy, it suffered a few leaks during emergency cyclone broadcasting, with water seeping down the walls and onto the floor.

In the late-2000s, plans were made to fit out two new studios in Broome and Kununurra and have both studios move there. The Sandalwood Street studio, while today still owned by the ABC, was stripped bare in 2010, and in 2011, ABC Kimberley moved to new premises on 23 Hammersley Street in Broome, and to 114b Coolibah Drive in Kununurra.

== See also ==
- Pilbara And Kimberley Aboriginal Media
- List of radio station callsigns in Western Australia
