= WAFM (Australia) =

Radio network in Western Australia, to 2015

- Australia
- Broadcast area: Broome, Geraldton, Karratha, Port Hedland
- Frequency: See below

Programming
- Format: Hit Music

Ownership
- Owner: Seven West Media
- Sister stations: Red FM; Spirit Radio Network

History
- First air date: Late 1990s
- Last air date: February 2015

Links
- Website: www.wafm.com.au

WAFM was a commercial radio network serving major regional towns in Western Australia, north of the capital Perth. It part of the Redwave Media group, which also included the Red FM and Spirit Network stations owned by Seven West Media. WAFM targeted the 18+ Listener with its Top 40 format. Programming came from its studios in Broome, Geraldton, Karratha and Port Hedland. In 2015 the WAFM stations were rebranded as Red FM.

== History ==
WAFM was formed in the late 1990s when supplementary FM licences were granted to existing licensees. The licensee in this case was North West Radio which became The Spirit Network. Originally WAFM broadcast to remote areas statewide, but this licence area was later covered by sister station Red FM. WAFM also expanded into Geraldton with the acquisition of local station 96.5FM.

In February 2015 WAFM was re-branded Red FM when it was merged with Redwave Media's main CHR Network.

== Stations ==
- Broome: 101.3FM
- Geraldton: 96.5FM
- Karratha: 106.5FM
- Port Hedland: 91.7FM
