= 91.3 SportFM =

Community radio station in Perth, Western Australia

- Hamilton Hill, Western Australia; Australia
- Broadcast area: Perth; Fremantle RA1 (Fremantle, Cockburn, and Melville areas)
- Frequency: 91.3 MHz FM
- Branding: 91.3 SportFM

Programming
- Language: English
- Format: Sports radio

Ownership
- Owner: 91.3 SportFM; (Western Sports Media Inc.)

History
- First air date: 2 February 2010
- Former frequencies: 101.7 MHz FM (2008, test broadcasts); 90.5 MHz FM (2003–2008, test broadcasts)
- Call sign meaning: 6 – Western Australia; Western Sports Media Inc.

Technical information
- Class: Community radio
- Transmitter coordinates: 32.087262°S 115.778896°E

Links
- Webcast: 32kbps Flash webstream
- Website: 91.3 SportFM

91.3 SportFM (ACMA callsign: 6WSM) is an Australian sport-formatted community radio station in Western Australia. Established in 2003, the station broadcasts in the Perth metropolitan area and to the City of Fremantle, Cockburn, and Melville areas, from studios in Hamilton Hill alongside Radio Fremantle.

== History ==
The station first began test broadcasts in 2003, under a Temporary Community Broadcasting Licence timeshared with Capital Radio, now Capital 101.7FM. Following the allocation of the 90.5FM frequency to Capital, and another licence to Noongar Radio on 100.9FM, the station ceased transmission.

Following further test transmissions on 101.7 FM, the station secured a full-time community licence for the Fremantle RA1 area, also served by Radio Fremantle. The station launched at 12:00 am on 2 February 2010.

=== Licence breaches ===
As a temporary broadcaster, the Australian Communications and Media Authority found it breached the Broadcasting Services Act 1992 by "broadcasting advertisements" and by "exceeding the hourly sponsorship limit of five minutes" in a broadcast of The Run Home sourced from 1116 SEN. The programme is no longer carried on the station.

== Programming ==
Weekday programming includes a live Breakfast programme, A live mid-morning show and a live drive-time afternoon programme. Live heritage specialty programmes run of a weekday evening and across weekends including WAFL World, The SMCA Cricket Show, The Football Fix, Before the Footy, Wednesday Wheels, Track and Field tonight, The AFLWrap, Talking Horses, Pure Footy, The Gloves are off and many more.

Station schedule includes regular live coverage of the West Australian Football League, National Rugby League, Sheffield Shield Cricket and A-League Football combined with a diverse range of daily Sports Talk programs, and hourly news updates sourced from Australian Independent Radio News each weekday between 6am and 6pm.

Sport FM also takes selected syndicated content from RSN 927 in Melbourne and 2GB in Sydney.

== Presenters ==
Sport FM is a known breeding ground for young broadcasting talent producing many broadcasters and media professionals who have gone on to forge careers in the sports and media industry.

Notable Presenters both past and present have included Colin Minson, Glenn Mitchell, Kim Hughes, Wayne Clark, Peter Vlahos, John Townsend, Corbin Middlemas, Ben Cameron, Brett Sprigg, Adam McGrath, Emma Payne, Jacob Landsmeer, Ashleigh Nelson, Kris Klifunis, Bryce Parker, Shayne Hope, Blayne Treadgold and Matt Grubelich amongst many others.

Sport FM regularly features various sports and media professionals including current and past players, coaches and administrators from various clubs and codes both locally, interstate and overseas.
