= Cyclone Christine =

Category 4 Australian region in 2013-14

Severe Tropical Cyclone Christine
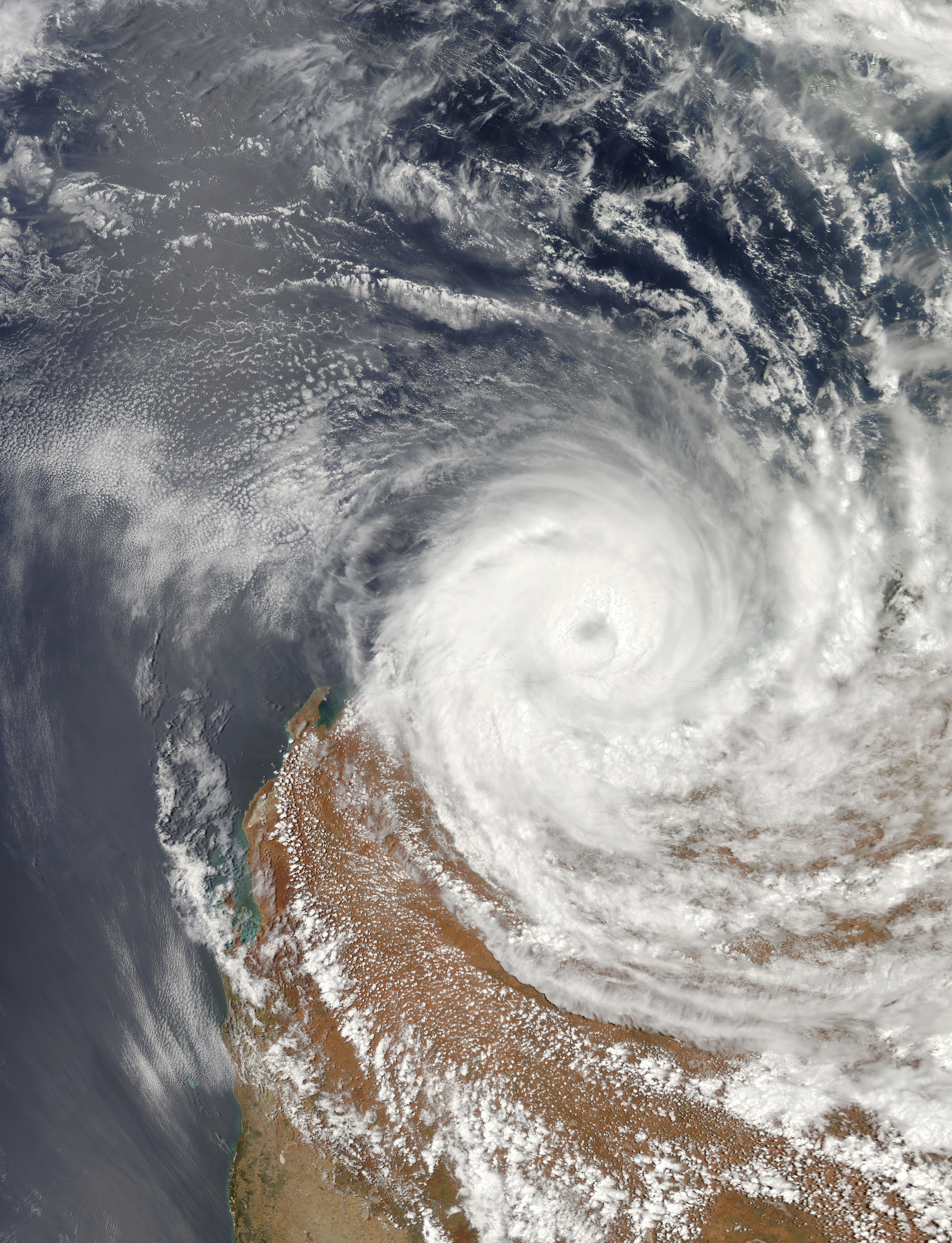
- Cyclone Christine at peak intensity on 30 December

Meteorological history
- Formed: 25 December 2013
- Dissipated: 1 January 2014

Category 4 severe tropical cyclone
- 10-minute sustained (BOM)
- Highest winds: 165 km/h (105 mph)
- Lowest pressure: 948 hPa (mbar); 27.99 inHg

Category 3-equivalent tropical cyclone
- 1-minute sustained (SSHWS/JTWC)
- Highest winds: 185 km/h (115 mph)
- Lowest pressure: 948 hPa (mbar); 27.99 inHg

Overall effects
- Fatalities: None
- Damage: Minimal
- Areas affected: Western Australia, South Australia, Victoria
- IBTrACS
- Part of the 2013–14 Australian region cyclone season

Severe Tropical Cyclone Christine was the third tropical cyclone and the second severe tropical cyclone of the 2013–14 Australian region cyclone season. It made landfall on Western Australia's Pilbara coast nearly halfway between the major towns of Karratha and Port Hedland as a category 4 cyclone on midnight of 31 December 2013.

== Meteorological history ==
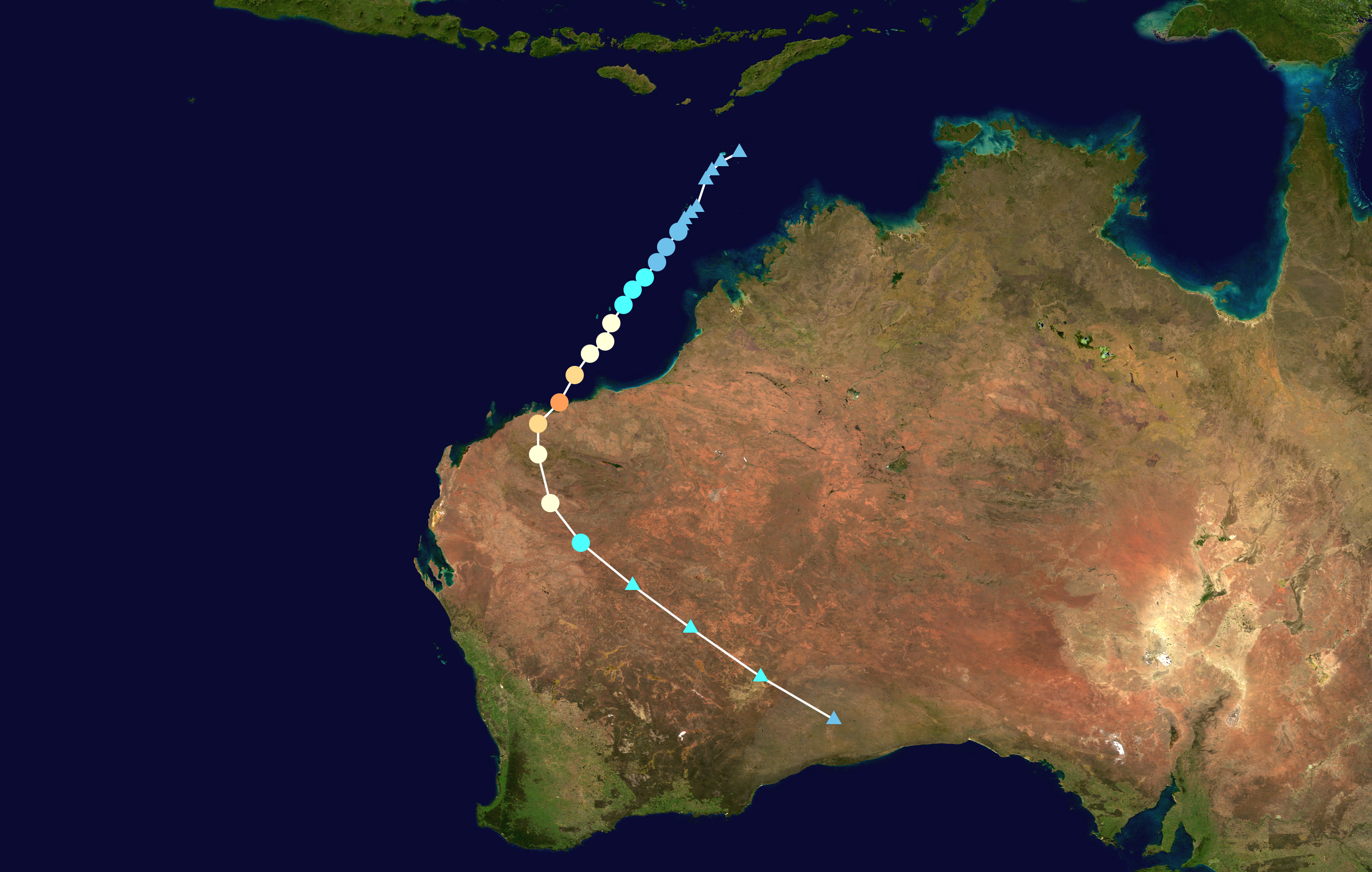
Map plotting the storm's track and intensity, according to the Saffir–Simpson scale Map key Saffir–Simpson scale Tropical depression (≤38 mph, ≤62 km/h) Tropical storm (39–73 mph, 63–118 km/h) Category 1 (74–95 mph, 119–153 km/h) Category 2 (96–110 mph, 154–177 km/h) Category 3 (111–129 mph, 178–208 km/h) Category 4 (130–156 mph, 209–251 km/h) Category 5 (≥157 mph, ≥252 km/h) Unknown Storm type Tropical cyclone Subtropical cyclone Extratropical cyclone, remnant low, tropical disturbance, or monsoon depression

On 25 December the Australian Bureau of Meteorology reported that a broad monsoonal circulation that they had been monitoring to the northwest of Western Australia had developed a discrete centre of circulation. Over the next few days the system slowly developed further as it moved towards the south-southwest, before during 28 December the BoM reported that the system had developed into a category 1 tropical cyclone on the Australian tropical cyclone intensity scale and named it Christine.

It intensified into a Category 2 storm on 29 December, Category 3 on 30 December, and then a marginal Category 4 on the same day. Watches and warnings were issued for areas between Derby and Exmouth, extending inland beyond the Pilbara to the Mid West and Goldfields–Esperance region around Wiluna and Leinster.

Christine made landfall between Roebourne and Whim Creek while strengthening around midnight on 31 December, with the eye passing through Roebourne itself, with Wickham skirting the edge of the eye. The storm began to turn to the southeast and began to weaken slowly.

== Impact ==
=== Western Australia ===
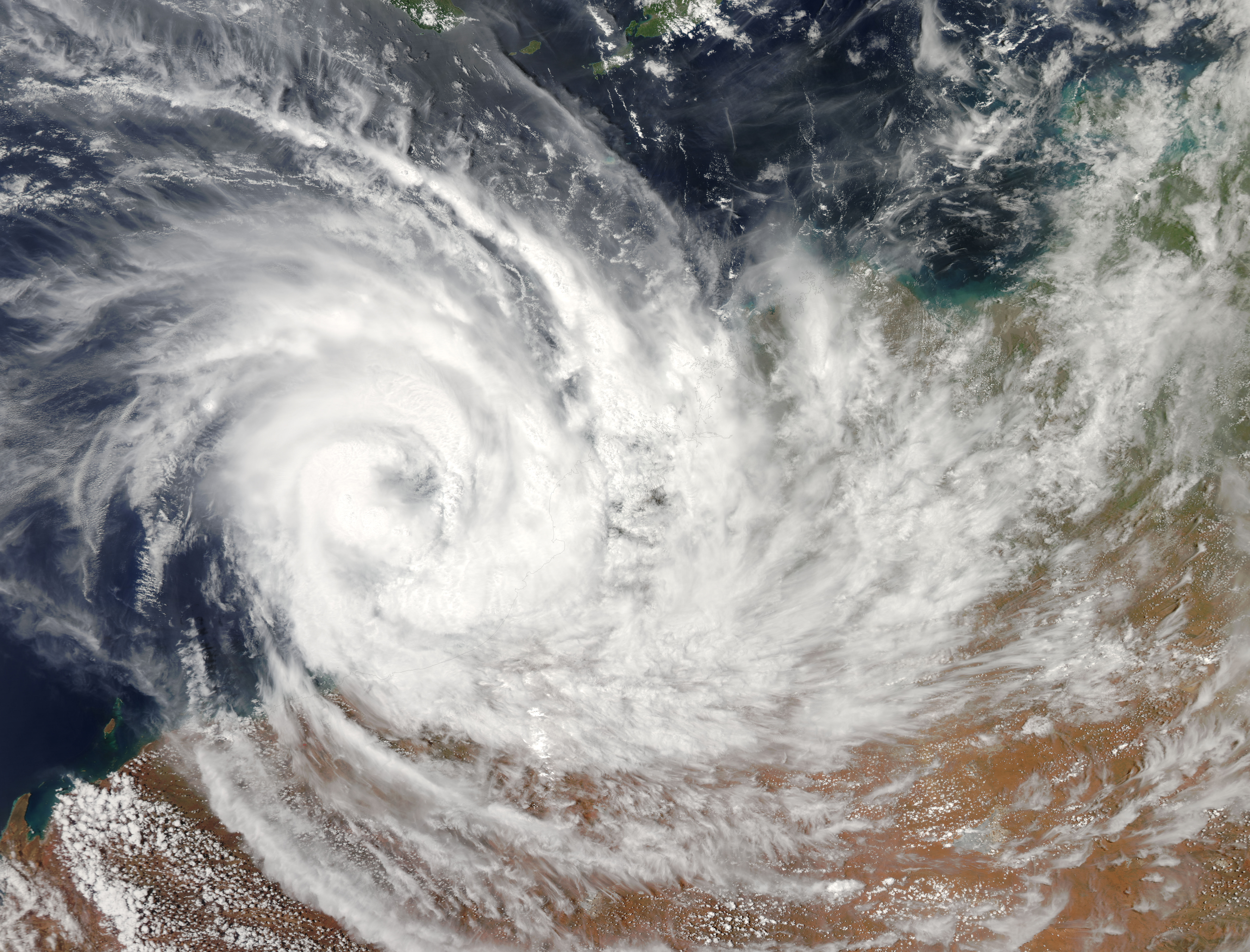
Cyclone Christine intensifying off the Australian coast on 29 December

Upon making landfall, Christine produced heavy rainfall across a large section of the West Australian Pilbara. In Roebourne, a total of 134.2 mm (5.28 in) was recorded by a rain gauge before the instrument failed, while the maximum daily precipitation total of 168 mm (6.6 in) was observed in Abydos North. Additionally, Port Hedland recorded 123.2 mm (4.85 in), Karratha 112.8 mm (4.44 in), while thunderstorms along Christine's outer bands produced three-day totals of 181.8 mm (7.16 in) in Broome and 137.2 mm (5.40 in) in Lagrange Bay. All mining and shipping operations were cancelled in Port Hedland, however no actual damage to mining infrastructure was reported. Roebourne and Wickham bore the brunt of Christine's winds, with a maximum confirmed gust of 172 km/h (107 mph) recorded at Roebourne. Both towns received significant damage and according to many local residents of Wickham, Christine was the worst cyclone in recent memory; several roofs were significantly damaged and many of the towns trees were uprooted and destroyed. In Roebourne, roofs of many houses collapsed under the weight of water or were ripped off by wind gusts, while the whole town lost electricity for a short period. Karratha and Port Hedland were spared any major damage, apart from minor flooding and wind-related damage. As Christine moved inland, flooding closed the Great Northern Highway north of Newman, however the town itself received 70 km/h (43 mph) wind gusts and only 25.0 mm (0.98 in) of rain.

An estimated 3–4.5 tonnes of iron ore was lost in exports across the Pilbara region due to Christine. Mining operations and shipments were suspended for three days, though most of the facilities sustained only minor damage if any. Despite the storm, Port Hedland reported a record monthly export of 29.9 million tonnes in December 2013, with 28.5 million tonnes being iron ore. This surpassed the previous record set in September 2013 by roughly 300,000 tonnes.

=== Elsewhere ===
As the remnant low of Christine moved south-eastwards and into South Australia, it combined with a thermal low whipping up gusty winds and causing extreme heat across central Australia. Moomba recorded a maximum of 49.3 °C (120.7 °F) on 2 January, almost beating its former record high set the year before. 70 km/h (43 mph) winds combined with the heat caused catastrophic fire dangers across the southern inland and a complete fire ban was issued for South Australia. As the extreme heat moved east, temperatures of 48.7 °C (119.7 °F) were recorded in Birdsville, Queensland and 49.1 °C (120.4 °F) in Walgett, New South Wales. Further south however, Christine's remnants caused light showers and a cooler change in the Adelaide area, while isolated thunderstorms caused 42.8 mm (1.69 in) of rain to fall in Eucla, more than triple the areas monthly average. Victoria and southern New South Wales also recorded light rain and a cooler change from Christine's remnants, with Melbourne reporting 4.8 mm (0.19 in) and maximum temperatures in the low 20 °C's during the New Years period.

The name Christine was replaced with Catherine in 2014, but the name was initially not been confirmed as retired, although by the 2020s, Christine has been included in the list of retired names.

== See also ==
- Cyclone Lua
- Cyclone Rusty – previous severe tropical cyclone to make landfall on the Pilbara coast
- Cyclone George
- Cyclone Gwenda
- Cyclone Veronica – the next severe tropical cyclone to impact the Pilbara coast, though it did not make landfall.
- Cyclone Damien – the next severe tropical cyclone to make landfall on the Pilbara coast
