= 6GGG =

Coordinates: 28.773068°S 114.611265°E

96.5 FM (WAFM)
Geraldton; Australia
- Broadcast area: Geraldton
- Frequency: 96.5MHz FM

Programming
- Format: Hit music
- Affiliations: WAFM

Ownership
- Owner: WA Newspapers; (Geraldton Broadcasters Pty Ltd)
- Sister stations: 98.1 The Spirit

History
- First air date: 1937 (as 6GE)
- Former call signs: 6GE - 96.5 GGG-FM

Technical information
- ERP: 30 kW

Links
- Website: wafm.com.au

6GGG (formerly 6GE) is a commercial radio station at 72 Chapman Road in Geraldton, Western Australia which has been broadcasting since 1937.

== History ==
6GGG was once part of the Whitford Radio Network which also included 6PM Perth and 6AM Northam. In the late 1980s, it was part of the Bond Radio Network, (owned by Alan Bond), headquartered at Perth's Radio 6PM. In 1991, it converted from 1008 AM to 96.5 FM and changed its callsign to 96.5 GGG-FM as the second commercial FM station in Regional WA, after opposition Geraldton station 98FM had launched earlier in 1991. The mid 1990s saw 98FM and 96.5 merge into one company. 2005 saw 96.5 relaunch as WAFM as part of the Redwave Media Network.

== Former announcers ==
- Tasma Walton
- Alan Pearsall (not the cricket player)
- Jeff Newman
- Tony Barber (Sale of the Century) (not Aztec's Guitar Player)
- Phil Bradshaw
- Lyle Harris (former station manager)
- Murray Johnson
- John Cecil
- John Hubbard
- Rob Fletcher
- Darryl Hames (former studio/program manager)
- Rob Buckingham
- John Harvey
- Jim Campbell
- David Wood (1984)
- Perry Vitale
- Chris Ilsley
- Ashley Malone (former station manager)
- Guy Sweeting (1987)
- Lindsay Gook (known as Lindsay Walker and sometimes Jay Walker on air)
- Colin Rowley (1987-1988)
- Duart Mercer (copy & floater) (1991–?)
- Rose Mercer (Production) (1991–?)
- Clive Murray - (1977–1978) (1985–1986) (1991–1994)
- Danielle Mia (Agnew)
- Jill Fowler (known as Amber Franklin on air)
- Tracy Wulff
- Rob Grant
- Jacqui Wright
- Tim Versteegan (called himself Tim Daniels on air)
- Mark Kennedy
- Jon Kennedy
- Victor Tanti
- Warren Kalazich
- Stuart Endersby
- Vic McCabe
- Ron Hayward
- John Hutchinson
- Andrew Sichter
- Peter Feorenza
- John Cartwright
- Ron O'Neil
- John De Bellis
- Brian 'Putter' Smith
- Mike Murphy
- Peter Newman
- George Manning
- Jim Fitzmaurice
- Chris Fenton (breakfast announcer 1988–1989)
- Con Vann
- Greg Smith
- Trevor Gee
