= Wangki Radio =

Radio station in Fitzroy Crossing, Western Australia

Wangki Yupurnanupurru Radio
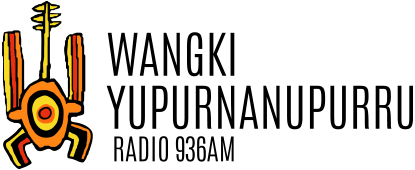
- Australia
- Broadcast area: Fitzroy Crossing, Western Australia
- Frequency: AM: 936 kHz
- Branding: Wangki Radio

Programming
- Languages: English; Bunuba; Gooniyandi; Walmajarri
- Format: Community radio
- Affiliations: First Nations Media Australia Community Broadcasting Association of Australia NIRS; PAKAM

History
- Call sign meaning: 6 – Western Australia; Fitzroy X'ing

Links
- Website: Wangki Radio

Wangki Yupurnanupurru Radio, usually shortened to Wangki Radio /wɒnɡkiː/, is an Aboriginal community radio station based in Fitzroy Crossing, Western Australia.

Wangki Radio has a weekly listenership of around 10,000 people in various communities surrounding the Fitzroy Valley and via its networked programming.

== History ==
Wangki Radio was developed in the late 1980s by Aboriginal elders and community members who saw the rapid development of media technology and wanted to ensure that their communities weren't left behind.

The ABC helped to establish many Aboriginal Radio stations in the Kimberley, hiring Wayne Bynder, who would decades later become Wangki's manager, to assist local communities in the development of the stations.

Wangki Radio began as a localised radio program on ABC Kimberley, presented by founding broadcaster Nooley Preston. Later, the radio station gained an AM license and began broadcasting 24 hours a day on 936 AM.

In 2014, a group of children broke into the studios and presented an impromptu late-night show full of swearing, previously being taught broadcasting skills during station training. The story gained international attention, being published in The Guardian, ABC & WAtoday.

In 2021, the Fremantle Dockers Next Generation Academy visited Wangki Radio broadcaster and passionate Dockers fan, Ethan Hoad. Ethan once played as a forward and midfielder for the Yakanarra Dockers in the Central Kimberley Football League before having a major accident which resulted in him using a wheelchair, he now works as a broadcaster for Wangki.

== Programming ==
Wangki Radio airs national news from NIRS, regional current affairs programming produced locally or through the PAKAM Network, world news from DW, interviews, road reports, and weather information. Wangki Radio is a member of First Nations Media Australia and draws national content through the country wide network of Aboriginal radio stations.

Wangki Radio broadcasts programs in Aboriginal Languages including the Danggujarra Language Program presented by Natalie Davey and Bullen Rogers.

Wangki Radio also broadcasts the general community discussion and news program, In The Valley, hosted by Geoff Davis and will broadcast local games of the Central Kimberley Football League.

Wangki Radio is an adopter of online content sharing, winning the 2019 Excellence in Digital Media award from the Community Broadcasting Association of Australia.
