= Radio Fremantle =

Radio Fremantle (6CCR)
- Hamilton Hill, Western Australia; Australia
- Broadcast area: Fremantle RA1 (Fremantle, Cockburn, and Melville areas)
- Frequency: 107.9 MHz
- Branding: Radio Fremantle

Programming
- Languages: English and multilingual
- Format: Community radio

Ownership
- Owner: Radio Fremantle; (Creative Community Radio Inc.)

History
- First air date: 1987
- Call sign meaning: 6 for Western Australia plus CCR for Creative Community Radio

Technical information
- Licensing authority: ACMA
- ERP: 1,000 watts
- Transmitter coordinates: 32.033272°S 115.770596°E

Links
- Public licence information: Profile
- Webcast: mms webstream
- Website: Radio Fremantle

Radio Fremantle (ACMA callsign: 6CCR) is an Australian community radio station in Western Australia. Established in 1987, the station broadcasts to the City of Fremantle, Cockburn, and Melville areas, from studios in Hamilton Hill alongside 91.3 SportFM. Radio Fremantle broadcasts a large variety of programs with a strong belief on local programming including local, youth and ethnic listeners. There is a varied range of specialist programs including, Jazz, Classical, Folk, Country, and West Australian music, these are aired alongside Variety programmes from Monday to Saturday. Radio Fremantle also provides a wide range of outside broadcasts. Sunday’s are dedicated to Fremantle's large ethnic audience including, African, Portuguese, Brazilian and the Serbian community. There is also a daily 'Collage' program that takes a look at the Arts and local issues, with different presenters each day. Radio Fremantle has over 70 different individual programmes, to include different audiences and interests.

From 1987 to 2000 they broadcast on the 100.1 MHz frequency; their studios were located in the now-Heritage listed former pCreative Community Radioolice station based in East Fremantle.
