= North Pilbara Football League =

- Formerly: De Grey West Pilbara Football League
- Sport: Australian rules football
- Founded: 1977
- No. of teams: 6
- Most recent champion: Karratha Falcons (2026)
- Most titles: Karratha Kats (13)
- Website: Official website

The North Pilbara Football League is an Australian rules football competition based in Karratha and Port Hedland in Western Australia.

== History of Football in the Pilbara ==
In 1977 the De Grey Football Association (based around Port Hedland) and West Pilbara Football League (based around Karratha) merged to form the De Gray West Pilbara Football League.

In 1983 there was a name change to North Pilbara Football League.

== Clubs ==
=== Locations ===
Locations of the North Pilbara FL clubs

=== Current ===
| Club | Colours | Nickname | Home Ground | Former League | Est. | Years in NPFL | NPFL Premierships | |
| Club | Colours | Nickname | Home Ground | Former League | Est. | Years in NPFL | Total | Years |
|---|---|---|---|---|---|---|---|---|
| Dampier | | Sharks | Windy Ridge Oval, Dampier | WPFA | 1972 | 1977– | 9 | 1983, 1984, 2005, 2008, 2009, 2021, 2022, 2023, 2024, |
| Karratha Falcons | | Falcons | Butler Reserve, Bulgarra | – | 1979 | 1979– | 6 | 1986, 1987, 1988, 2006, 2010, 2026 |
| Karratha Kats | | Kats | Kevin Richards Oval, Millars Well | WPFA | 1972 | 1977– | 13 | 1979, 1981, 1989, 1991, 1999, 2000, 2001, 2003, 2004, 2014, 2016, 2018, 2025 |
| Port Hedland Rovers | | Bulldogs | Colin Matheson Oval, Port Hedland | DGFA | 1967 | 1977– | 9 | 1978, 1990, 1997, 1998, 2002, 2007, 2011, 2012, 2013 |
| South Hedland | | Mighty Swans | Kevin Scott Oval, South Hedland | DGFA | 1975 | 1977– | 9 | 1980, 1985, 1992, 1993, 1994, 1995, 1996, 2015, 2020 |
| Wickham | | Wolves | Wickham Town Oval, Wickham | WPFA | 1972 | 1977– | 2 | 2017, 2019 |

=== Former ===
| Club | Colours | Nickname | Home Ground | Former League | Est. | Years in NPFL | NPFL Premierships | | Fate |
| Club | Colours | Nickname | Home Ground | Former League | Est. | Years in NPFL | Total | Years | Fate |
|---|---|---|---|---|---|---|---|---|---|
| Burrup | | | | | 1982 | 1982 | 0 | - | Winless in its only season. |
| Finucane Island | | | Finucane Island Oval, Finucane Island | DGFA | 1967 | 1980-1982, 1985-1987 | 0 | - | Returned from recess in 1979 (played DGFL reserves) and returned to senior ranks from 1980-82 before going back into recess. Absorbed by Port Hedland Panthers after the 1984 season and played as Finucane Island Panthers (1985) and Finucane Island (1986-87) before disbanding. |
| Goldsworthy | | Tigers | Goldsworthy Oval, Goldsworthy | DGFA | 1969 | 1977–1981 | 1 | 1977 | Folded after 1981 season |
| Port Hedland | | Panthers | | DGFA | 1969 | 1977–1984 | 1 | 1982 | "Merged" with Finucane Island after the 1984 season to become the Finucane Island Panthers. Folded after the 1987 season |
| Shay Gap | | Hawks | Shay Gap Oval, Shay Gap | DGFA | 1975 | 1977–1983 | 0 | - | Demoted from senior ranks after the 1980 season. Played reserves football until 1983. |

== 2006 ladder ==
| North Pilbara | Wins | Byes | Losses | Draws | For | Against | % | Pts | Final | Team | G | B | Pts | Team | G | B | Pts |
|---|---|---|---|---|---|---|---|---|---|---|---|---|---|---|---|---|---|
| Karratha Falcons | 11 | 0 | 3 | 1 | 1514 | 1267 | 119.49% | 46 | 1st semi | Wickham | 21 | 13 | 139 | Port Hedland | 17 | 10 | 112 |
| Dampier | 10 | 0 | 5 | 0 | 1630 | 1172 | 139.08% | 40 | 2nd semi | Dampier | 20 | 15 | 135 | Karratha Falcons | 14 | 11 | 95 |
| Port Hedland | 8 | 0 | 6 | 1 | 1456 | 1140 | 127.72% | 34 | Preliminary | Karratha Falcons | 18 | 10 | 118 | Wickham | 17 | 12 | 114 |
| Wickham | 7 | 0 | 8 | 0 | 1358 | 1622 | 83.72% | 28 | Grand | Karratha Falcons | 17 | 6 | 108 | Dampier | 15 | 11 | 101 |
| Karratha Kats | 4 | 0 | 11 | 0 | 1151 | 1458 | 78.94% | 16 | | | | | | | | | |
| South Hedland | 4 | 0 | 11 | 0 | 916 | 1366 | 67.06% | 16 | | | | | | | | | |

== 2007 ladder ==
| North Pilbara | Wins | Byes | Losses | Draws | For | Against | % | Pts | Final | Team | G | B | Pts | Team | G | B | Pts |
|---|---|---|---|---|---|---|---|---|---|---|---|---|---|---|---|---|---|
| Karratha Falcons | 12 | 0 | 3 | 0 | 1943 | 916 | 212.12% | 48 | 1st semi | South Hedland | 11 | 12 | 78 | Dampier | 8 | 10 | 58 |
| Port Hedland | 11 | 0 | 4 | 0 | 1631 | 896 | 182.03% | 44 | 2nd semi | Port Hedland | 17 | 6 | 108 | Karratha Falcons | 11 | 13 | 79 |
| South Hedland | 10 | 0 | 5 | 0 | 1251 | 1125 | 111.20% | 40 | Preliminary | Karratha Falcons | 19 | 11 | 125 | South Hedland | 13 | 13 | 91 |
| Dampier | 7 | 0 | 8 | 0 | 1291 | 1297 | 99.54% | 28 | Grand | Port Hedland | 18 | 17 | 125 | Karratha Falcons | 9 | 10 | 64 |
| Wickham | 4 | 0 | 11 | 0 | 1154 | 1661 | 69.48% | 16 | | | | | | | | | |
| Karratha Kats | 1 | 0 | 14 | 0 | 697 | 2072 | 33.64% | 4 | | | | | | | | | |

== 2008 ladder ==
| North Pilbara | Wins | Byes | Losses | Draws | For | Against | % | Pts | Final | Team | G | B | Pts | Team | G | B | Pts |
|---|---|---|---|---|---|---|---|---|---|---|---|---|---|---|---|---|---|
| Dampier | 13 | 0 | 2 | 0 | 1711 | 995 | 171.96% | 52 | 1st semi | Karratha Falcons | 18 | 19 | 127 | Wickham | 16 | 13 | 109 |
| Port Hedland | 11 | 0 | 4 | 0 | 1663 | 1023 | 162.56% | 44 | 2nd semi | Dampier | 12 | 7 | 79 | Port Hedland | 12 | 6 | 78 |
| Karratha Falcons | 9 | 0 | 6 | 0 | 1328 | 1244 | 106.75% | 36 | Preliminary | Port Hedland | 16 | 13 | 109 | Karratha Falcons | 12 | 10 | 82 |
| Wickham | 8 | 0 | 7 | 0 | 1445 | 1176 | 122.87% | 32 | Grand | Dampier | 21 | 12 | 138 | Port Hedland | 11 | 13 | 79 |
| South Hedland | 3 | 0 | 12 | 0 | 703 | 1360 | 51.69% | 12 | | | | | | | | | |
| Karratha Kats | 1 | 0 | 14 | 0 | 419 | 1471 | 28.48% | 4 | | | | | | | | | |

== 2009 ladder ==
| North Pilbara | Wins | Byes | Losses | Draws | For | Against | % | Pts | Final | Team | G | B | Pts | Team | G | B | Pts |
|---|---|---|---|---|---|---|---|---|---|---|---|---|---|---|---|---|---|
| Karratha Falcons | 14 | 0 | 1 | 0 | 1765 | 660 | 267.42% | 56 | 1st semi | Port Hedland | 16 | 9 | 105 | Karratha Kats | 7 | 8 | 50 |
| Dampier | 12 | 0 | 3 | 0 | 1801 | 856 | 210.40% | 48 | 2nd semi | Karratha Falcons | 0 | 0 | 0 | Dampier | 0 | 0 | 0 |
| Port Hedland | 8 | 0 | 7 | 0 | 1148 | 1005 | 114.23% | 32 | Preliminary | Dampier | 17 | 11 | 113 | Port Hedland | 6 | 9 | 45 |
| Karratha Kats | 6 | 0 | 9 | 0 | 1288 | 1297 | 99.31% | 24 | Grand | Dampier | 8 | 13 | 61 | Karratha Falcons | 7 | 2 | 44 |
| Wickham | 3 | 0 | 12 | 0 | 539 | 2079 | 25.93% | 12 | | | | | | | | | |
| South Hedland | 2 | 0 | 13 | 0 | 710 | 1354 | 52.44% | 8 | | | | | | | | | |

== 2010 ladder ==
| North Pilbara | Wins | Byes | Losses | Draws | For | Against | % | Pts | Final | Team | G | B | Pts | Team | G | B | Pts |
|---|---|---|---|---|---|---|---|---|---|---|---|---|---|---|---|---|---|
| Karratha Falcons | 13 | 0 | 2 | 0 | 1455 | 614 | 236.97% | 52 | 1st semi | Karratha Kats | 13 | 11 | 89 | Dampier | 10 | 10 | 70 |
| Port Hedland | 13 | 0 | 2 | 0 | 1241 | 723 | 171.65% | 52 | 2nd semi | Karratha Falcons | 9 | 10 | 64 | Port Hedland | 5 | 10 | 40 |
| Karratha Kats | 8 | 0 | 7 | 0 | 1505 | 1082 | 139.09% | 32 | Preliminary | Port Hedland | 9 | 14 | 68 | Karratha Kats | 10 | 3 | 63 |
| Dampier | 6 | 0 | 9 | 0 | 1044 | 1081 | 96.58% | 24 | Grand | Karratha Falcons | 12 | 10 | 82 | Port Hedland | 6 | 14 | 50 |
| South Hedland | 3 | 0 | 12 | 0 | 658 | 1561 | 42.15% | 12 | | | | | | | | | |
| Wickham | 2 | 0 | 13 | 0 | 529 | 1371 | 38.58% | 8 | | | | | | | | | |

== 2011 ladder ==
| North Pilbara | Wins | Byes | Losses | Draws | For | Against | % | Pts | Final | Team | G | B | Pts | Team | G | B | Pts |
|---|---|---|---|---|---|---|---|---|---|---|---|---|---|---|---|---|---|
| Port Hedland | 13 | 0 | 2 | 0 | 1470 | 910 | 161.54% | 52 | 1st semi | South Hedland | 17 | 10 | 112 | Karratha Kats | 9 | 12 | 66 |
| Karratha Falcons | 10 | 0 | 4 | 1 | 1268 | 902 | 140.58% | 42 | 2nd semi | Port Hedland | 12 | 21 | 93 | Karratha Falcons | 9 | 11 | 65 |
| South Hedland | 10 | 0 | 5 | 0 | 1228 | 1157 | 106.14% | 40 | Preliminary | South Hedland | 12 | 13 | 85 | Karratha Falcons | 12 | 6 | 78 |
| Karratha Kats | 6 | 0 | 9 | 0 | 1023 | 1375 | 74.40% | 24 | Grand | Port Hedland | 13 | 13 | 91 | South Hedland | 7 | 5 | 47 |
| Dampier | 4 | 0 | 11 | 0 | 1301 | 1391 | 93.53% | 16 | | | | | | | | | |
| Wickham | 1 | 0 | 13 | 1 | 603 | 1158 | 52.07% | 6 | | | | | | | | | |

== 2012 ladder ==
| North Pilbara | Wins | Byes | Losses | Draws | For | Against | % | Pts | Final | Team | G | B | Pts | Team | G | B | Pts |
|---|---|---|---|---|---|---|---|---|---|---|---|---|---|---|---|---|---|
| Karratha Falcons | 13 | 0 | 2 | 0 | 1544 | 907 | 170.23% | 52 | 1st semi | Karratha Kats | 18 | 18 | 126 | South Hedland | 4 | 3 | 27 |
| Port Hedland | 11 | 0 | 4 | 0 | 1607 | 1057 | 152.03% | 44 | 2nd semi | Port Hedland | 17 | 11 | 113 | Karratha Falcons | 9 | 8 | 62 |
| Karratha Kats | 9 | 0 | 6 | 0 | 1523 | 1060 | 143.68% | 36 | Preliminary | Karratha Kats | 21 | 14 | 140 | Karratha Falcons | 10 | 11 | 71 |
| South Hedland | 5 | 0 | 10 | 0 | 1381 | 1123 | 122.97% | 20 | Grand | Port Hedland | 17 | 8 | 110 | Karratha Kats | 12 | 7 | 79 |
| Wickham | 5 | 0 | 10 | 0 | 1162 | 1604 | 72.44% | 20 | | | | | | | | | |
| Dampier | 2 | 0 | 13 | 0 | 650 | 2116 | 30.72% | 8 | | | | | | | | | |

== 2013 ladder ==
| North Pilbara | Wins | Byes | Losses | Draws | For | Against | % | Pts | Final | Team | G | B | Pts | Team | G | B | Pts |
|---|---|---|---|---|---|---|---|---|---|---|---|---|---|---|---|---|---|
| Wickham | 11 | 0 | 3 | 1 | 1533 | 942 | 162.74% | 46 | 1st semi | Karratha Falcons | 13 | 9 | 87 | Karratha Kats | 7 | 12 | 54 |
| Port Hedland | 11 | 0 | 4 | 0 | 1535 | 1040 | 147.60% | 44 | 2nd semi | Port Hedland | 16 | 15 | 111 | Wickham | 10 | 7 | 67 |
| Karratha Falcons | 10 | 0 | 5 | 0 | 1229 | 1018 | 120.73% | 40 | Preliminary | Wickham | 13 | 18 | 96 | Karratha Falcons | 8 | 5 | 53 |
| Karratha Kats | 8 | 0 | 6 | 1 | 1359 | 1175 | 115.66% | 34 | Grand | Port Hedland | 11 | 12 | 78 | Wickham | 7 | 14 | 56 |
| Dampier | 3 | 0 | 12 | 0 | 1008 | 1683 | 59.89% | 12 | | | | | | | | | |
| South Hedland | 1 | 0 | 14 | 0 | 922 | 1728 | 53.36% | 4 | | | | | | | | | |

== 2014 ladder ==
| North Pilbara | Wins | Byes | Losses | Draws | For | Against | % | Pts | Final | Team | G | B | Pts | Team | G | B | Pts |
|---|---|---|---|---|---|---|---|---|---|---|---|---|---|---|---|---|---|
| Port Hedland Rovers | 12 | 0 | 2 | 1 | 1768 | 860 | 205.58% | 50 | 1st semi | Dampier Sharks | 16 | 11 | 107 | Karratha Falcons | 13 | 9 | 87 |
| Karratha Kats | 10 | 0 | 5 | 0 | 1471 | 1149 | 128.02% | 40 | 2nd semi | Port Hedland Rovers | 12 | 7 | 79 | Karratha Kats | 6 | 5 | 41 |
| Dampier Sharks | 9 | 0 | 6 | 0 | 1397 | 1385 | 100.87% | 36 | Preliminary | Karratha Kats | 12 | 10 | 82 | Dampier Sharks | 11 | 8 | 74 |
| Karratha Falcons | 6 | 0 | 9 | 0 | 1159 | 1375 | 84.29% | 24 | Grand | Karratha Kats | 15 | 6 | 96 | Port Hedland Rovers | 10 | 6 | 66 |
| South Hedland Swans | 6 | 0 | 9 | 0 | 1145 | 1452 | 78.86% | 24 | | | | | | | | | |
| Wickham Wolves | 1 | 0 | 13 | 1 | 998 | 1717 | 58.12% | 6 | | | | | | | | | |

== 2015 ladder ==
| North Pilbara | Wins | Byes | Losses | Draws | For | Against | % | Pts | Final | Team | G | B | Pts | Team | G | B | Pts |
|---|---|---|---|---|---|---|---|---|---|---|---|---|---|---|---|---|---|
| Dampier Sharks | 12 | 0 | 3 | 0 | 1608 | 892 | 180.27% | 48 | 1st semi | Wickham Wolves | 10 | 10 | 70 | Port Hedland Rovers | 7 | 9 | 51 |
| South Hedland Swans | 12 | 0 | 3 | 0 | 1519 | 897 | 169.34% | 48 | 2nd semi | South Hedland Swans | 15 | 6 | 96 | Dampier Sharks | 10 | 10 | 70 |
| Wickham Wolves | 7 | 0 | 8 | 1 | 1043 | 1287 | 81.04% | 30 | Preliminary | Dampier Sharks | 14 | 14 | 98 | Wickham Wolves | 8 | 9 | 57 |
| Port Hedland Rovers | 6 | 0 | 9 | 0 | 965 | 1414 | 68.25% | 24 | Grand | South Hedland Swans | 13 | 19 | 97 | Dampier Sharks | 10 | 12 | 72 |
| Karratha Kats | 5 | 0 | 10 | 0 | 1020 | 1154 | 88.39% | 20 | | | | | | | | | |
| Karratha Falcons | 3 | 0 | 12 | 0 | 911 | 1422 | 64.06% | 12 | | | | | | | | | |

== 2016 ladder ==
| North Pilbara | Wins | Byes | Losses | Draws | For | Against | % | Pts | Final | Team | G | B | Pts | Team | G | B | Pts |
|---|---|---|---|---|---|---|---|---|---|---|---|---|---|---|---|---|---|
| Wickham Wolves | 12 | 0 | 2 | 1 | 1401 | 848 | 165.21% | 50 | 1st semi | Karratha Kats | 9 | 12 | 66 | Port Hedland Rovers | 8 | 3 | 51 |
| South Hedland Swans | 11 | 0 | 3 | 1 | 1435 | 943 | 152.17% | 46 | 2nd semi | South Hedland Swans | 9 | 13 | 67 | Wickham Wolves | 10 | 6 | 66 |
| Karratha Kats | 7 | 0 | 7 | 1 | 1152 | 898 | 128.29% | 30 | Preliminary | Karratha Kats | 9 | 8 | 62 | Wickham Wolves | 8 | 4 | 52 |
| Port Hedland Rovers | 6 | 0 | 8 | 1 | 1056 | 1079 | 97.87% | 26 | Grand | Karratha Kats | 12 | 10 | 82 | South Hedland Swans | 7 | 6 | 48 |
| Dampier Sharks | 4 | 0 | 11 | 0 | 911 | 1542 | 59.08% | 16 | | | | | | | | | |
| Karratha Falcons | 3 | 0 | 12 | 0 | 815 | 1460 | 55.82% | 12 | | | | | | | | | |

== 2017 ladder ==
| North Pilbara | Wins | Byes | Losses | Draws | For | Against | % | Pts | Final | Team | G | B | Pts | Team | G | B | Pts |
|---|---|---|---|---|---|---|---|---|---|---|---|---|---|---|---|---|---|
| Wickham Wolves | 14 | 0 | 1 | 0 | 1447 | 738 | 196.07% | 56 | 1st semi | Karratha Kats | 19 | 8 | 122 | South Hedland | 9 | 8 | 62 |
| Dampier Sharks | 10 | 0 | 5 | 0 | 1280 | 878 | 145.79% | 40 | 2nd semi | Wickham Wolves | 11 | 8 | 74 | Dampier | 5 | 13 | 43 |
| Karratha Kats | 10 | 0 | 5 | 0 | 1242 | 859 | 144.59% | 40 | Preliminary | Dampier | 13 | 7 | 85 | Karratha Kats | 6 | 7 | 43 |
| South Hedland Swans | 5 | 0 | 10 | 0 | 1070 | 1311 | 81.62% | 20 | Grand | Wickham Wolves | 12 | 13 | 85 | Dampier | 9 | 6 | 60 |
| Port Hedland Rovers | 5 | 0 | 10 | 0 | 848 | 1347 | 62.95% | 20 | | | | | | | | | |
| Karratha Falcons | 1 | 0 | 14 | 0 | 681 | 1435 | 47.46% | 4 | | | | | | | | | |

== 2018 ladder ==
| North Pilbara | Wins | Byes | Losses | Draws | For | Against | % | Pts | Final | Team | G | B | Pts | Team | G | B | Pts |
|---|---|---|---|---|---|---|---|---|---|---|---|---|---|---|---|---|---|
| Wickham Wolves | 13 | 0 | 2 | 0 | 1726 | 770 | 224.16% | 52 | 1st semi | South Hedland | 13 | 12 | 90 | Dampier Sharks | 9 | 8 | 62 |
| Karratha Kats | 13 | 0 | 2 | 0 | 1427 | 768 | 185.81% | 52 | 2nd semi | Karratha Kats | 11 | 18 | 84 | Wickham Wolves | 8 | 10 | 58 |
| South Hedland Swans | 10 | 0 | 5 | 0 | 1360 | 948 | 143.46% | 40 | Preliminary | Wickham Wolves | 19 | 8 | 122 | South Hedland | 4 | 16 | 40 |
| Dampier Sharks | 6 | 0 | 9 | 0 | 1047 | 1307 | 80.11% | 24 | Grand | Karratha Kats | 13 | 8 | 86 | Wickham Wolves | 9 | 9 | 63 |
| Karratha Falcons | 2 | 0 | 13 | 0 | 978 | 1462 | 66.89% | 8 | | | | | | | | | |
| Port Hedland Rovers | 1 | 0 | 14 | 0 | 543 | 1826 | 29.74% | 4 | | | | | | | | | |

== 2019 ladder ==
| North Pilbara | Wins | Byes | Losses | Draws | For | Against | % | Pts | Final | Team | G | B | Pts | Team | G | B | Pts |
|---|---|---|---|---|---|---|---|---|---|---|---|---|---|---|---|---|---|
| Wickham Wolves | 14 | 0 | 1 | 0 | 1533 | 855 | 179.30% | 56 | 1st semi | Dampier Sharks | 10 | 10 | 70 | Port Hedland Rovers | 8 | 11 | 59 |
| Karratha Kats | 11 | 0 | 4 | 0 | 1239 | 862 | 143.74% | 44 | 2nd semi | Karratha Kats | 9 | 6 | 60 | Wickham Wolves | 7 | 10 | 52 |
| Dampier Sharks | 7 | 0 | 8 | 0 | 1337 | 1123 | 119.06% | 28 | Preliminary | Wickham Wolves | 10 | 7 | 67 | Dampier Sharks | 8 | 13 | 61 |
| Port Hedland Rovers | 6 | 0 | 9 | 0 | 926 | 1060 | 87.36% | 24 | Grand | Wickham Wolves | 10 | 5 | 65 | Karratha Kats | 8 | 16 | 64 |
| South Hedland Swans | 4 | 0 | 11 | 0 | 1111 | 1296 | 85.73% | 16 | | | | | | | | | |
| Karratha Falcons | 3 | 0 | 12 | 0 | 799 | 1749 | 45.68% | 12 | | | | | | | | | |

== Website ==
Official website
