= VLW6 =

Former short wave radio station in Western Australia

VLW6 was a short wave radio service of the Australian Broadcasting Commission in Western Australia between the 1940s and the 1980s.

It was a relay service for services broadcast in Perth, Western Australia. It was utilised for the ABC overseas service.

It was transmitted from Wanneroo. It was one of a number of Australian short wave stations in operation the 1940s, other stations included:

VLR, and VLQ.

VLG.

VLW6 and other Western Australian short wave services were closed down in 2017.
