= Pilbara and Kimberley Aboriginal Media =

Indigenous media association in Australia

Pilbara and Kimberley Aboriginal Media (PAKAM) is an Indigenous media association based in Broome, Western Australia. PAKAM broadcasts into the northern Pilbara and the Kimberley regions. As an Indigenous media producer, PAKAM relies on and covers content within the Kimberley region and the communities within. Their service also enables the sharing of news, information, media, music, culture and broadcast events throughout their area coverage. They cover over a million square kilometres of Northwestern Australia and re-transmit their programs full-time to an audience of approximately 5,000 listeners.

== Awards ==
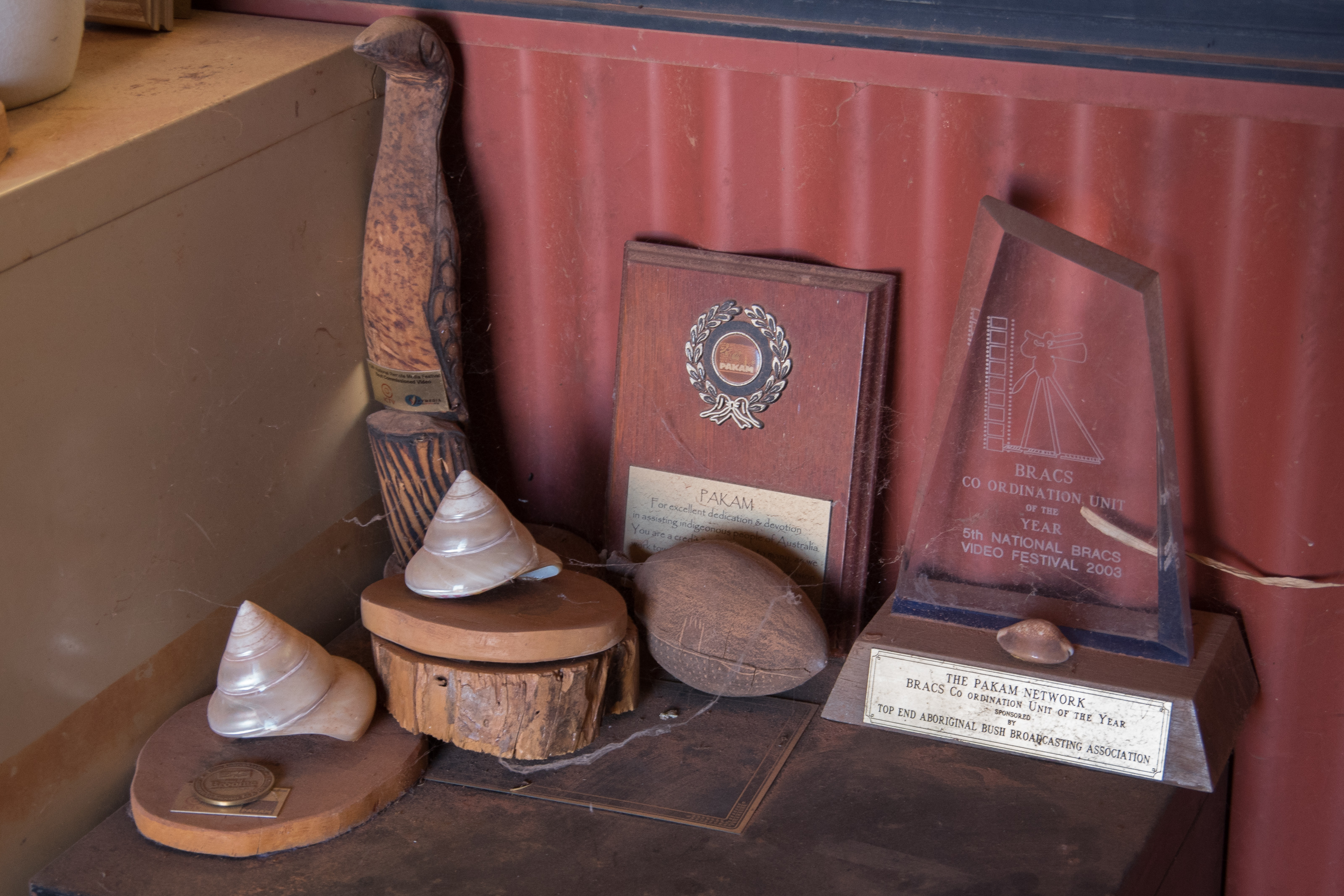
Some of the awards received by PAKAM

- 13th National Remote Indigenous Media Festival.
  - Leanna Shoveller, Steve McGregor Award for Best Emerging Talent
  - Kapululangu Nakarra Nakarra Dreaming Track Trip, Best Cultural Video
  - Sunday Island – Amy Hunter, Best Oral History
  - KIS Promo, Best Commissioned Video
  - Shall we Dance, Yirrman Project – Leanna Shoveller, ICTV Award for Best Editing
  - Djarindjin Women's Art for Country, Special Award
  - Ian Waina, Best Emerging Radio Talent
  - Trevor Ishiguschi, Best RIBS Operator
