= Noongar Radio 100.9 =

Coordinates: 31.94634°S 115.86447°E

Noongar Radio 100.9 FM
- Perth, Western Australia; Australia
- Broadcast area: Perth metropolitan region
- Frequency: 100.9 MHz
- Branding: Sounds Solid

Programming
- Languages: English, Noongar
- Format: Indigenous talk and music
- Affiliations: First Nations Media Australia, Community Broadcasting Association of Australia

Ownership
- Owner: Kuditj Pty Ltd.

History
- First air date: 5 July 2008

Links
- Website: www.noongarradio.com

Noongar Radio 100.9 FM is an Aboriginal community radio station in Perth, Western Australia.

The station is the only Indigenous radio station in the Perth metropolitan region and promotes itself as a voice to the local Indigenous community, the Noongar people, First Nations people living in Perth, and non-Indigenous community members.

In January 2008 the Australian Communications and Media Authority allocated a broadcasting licence for 100.9 MHz to Peedac Pty Ltd. The callsign 6NME refers to the initials of Noongar Media Enterprises, then a Peedac subsidiary.

The station's intended market is the local Indigenous community and those interested in Indigenous culture and affairs.

== History ==
What would become Noongar Radio started as a segment on radio station 6NR at the Western Australian Institute of Technology in 1979.

The Western Australian Aboriginal Media Association was granted a community broadcasting licence in 1992, launching Noongar Radio. The license was revoked in 2006 following a number of complaints to the broadcasting regulator.

Noongar Radio was relaunched on 100.9 FM on Sunday 5 July 2008 after being granted a community radio licence under a new subsidiary, PEEDAC, now Kuditj.
