= RTHK Radio 3 =

Hong Kong radio station

- Hong Kong
- Frequency: 567 kHz

Programming
- Language: English (official/main)
- Format: English-language news and information (19%), Entertainment (16%) and Easy listening/Hot adult contemporary (65%)

Ownership
- Owner: Hong Kong Government; (via Radio Television Hong Kong)
- Operator: Radio Television Hong Kong
- Sister stations: RTHK Radio 4 (English; classical music); other radio and TV channels of RTHK

History
- First air date: 30 June 1928; 98 years ago
- Former call signs: GOW (30 June 1928—1 February 1929); ZBW (1 February 1929—August 1948)
- Former frequencies: 845/1525 kHz (1928); 860 kHz (1929)

Links
- Webcast: https://www.rthk.hk/radio/radio3
- Website: https://www.rthk.hk/

RTHK Radio 3 (Chinese: 香港電台第三台; Jyutping: hoeng1gong2 din6toi4 dai6saam1 toi4) is a broadcasting station under Radio Television Hong Kong. It was launched on 30 June 1928 and is the first radio broadcast station in Hong Kong. At present, the station broadcasts on 567 kHz for all of Hong Kong, as well as additional FM frequency in selected regions.

RTHK Radio 3, which is mainly broadcast in English, is positioned as a “news and information and entertainment platform” to tie in with the pace of international metropolises in Hong Kong and provide information for English speakers in Hong Kong to help them understand world and local affairs. There are Nepali, Urdu and Tagalog periods. Notable shows include current affairs program 'Backchat', economics and finance-oriented 'Money Talk', and afternoon lifestyle program 'The 1 2 3 Show'.

== History ==
The station was the first radio station established by Radio Television Hong Kong. From the beginning, the call sign was GOW and the frequencies were AM 845 kHz and AM 1525 kHz. On 1 February 1929, the call sign was changed to ZBW and the frequency was AM 860 kHz. In August 1948, the station cancelled its call sign and changed its name in 1981.

It's radio team has organized and broadcast fundraising reality shows for charity since the 1960s. Later, in the 1980s, RTHK Radio 3 invented a Christmas contest called "Operation Santa Claus" raising money for charity. This contest became a longstanding Christmas tradition in Hong Kong.

== World's Most Durable DJ Uncle Ray ==
DJ Uncle Ray (Ray Cordeiro) was called in 2000 by Guinness World Records as The World's Most Durable DJ. Until his death, Ray Cordeiro hosted RTHK Radio 3 "All the Way with Uncle Ray", a show of popular music. He started his radio career with Radio Rediffusion in 1949 in age of 25, and joined RTHK in 1960.
