= ABC Midwest & Wheatbelt =

Radio station in Western Australia

- Australia
- Broadcast area: Midwest Wheatbelt
- Frequencies: 828 kHz AM Midwest; 1215 kHz AM Midwest; 531 kHz AM Wheatbelt

Programming
- Format: Talk

Ownership
- Owner: Australian Broadcasting Corporation

History
- First air date: 3 February 1945

Technical information
- Transmitter coordinates: 28°46′33.94″S 114°36′21.24″E

Links
- Website: https://www.abc.net.au/wheatbelt/

ABC Midwest & Wheatbelt is an ABC Local Radio station based in Geraldton.

The station broadcasts to the Mid West and Wheatbelt regions of Western Australia. This includes the towns of Meekatharra Northam and Dalwallinu. The station broadcasts through three main AM transmitters. 6GN on 828 AM, 6NM on 1215 AM and 6DL on 531 AM. There are also a number of low power FM transmitters. When local programs are not broadcast the station is a relay of 720 ABC Perth.

The precursor local stations went on the AM band included:

6GN – 1945.

== See also ==
- List of radio stations in Australia
