= Red FM (Australia) =

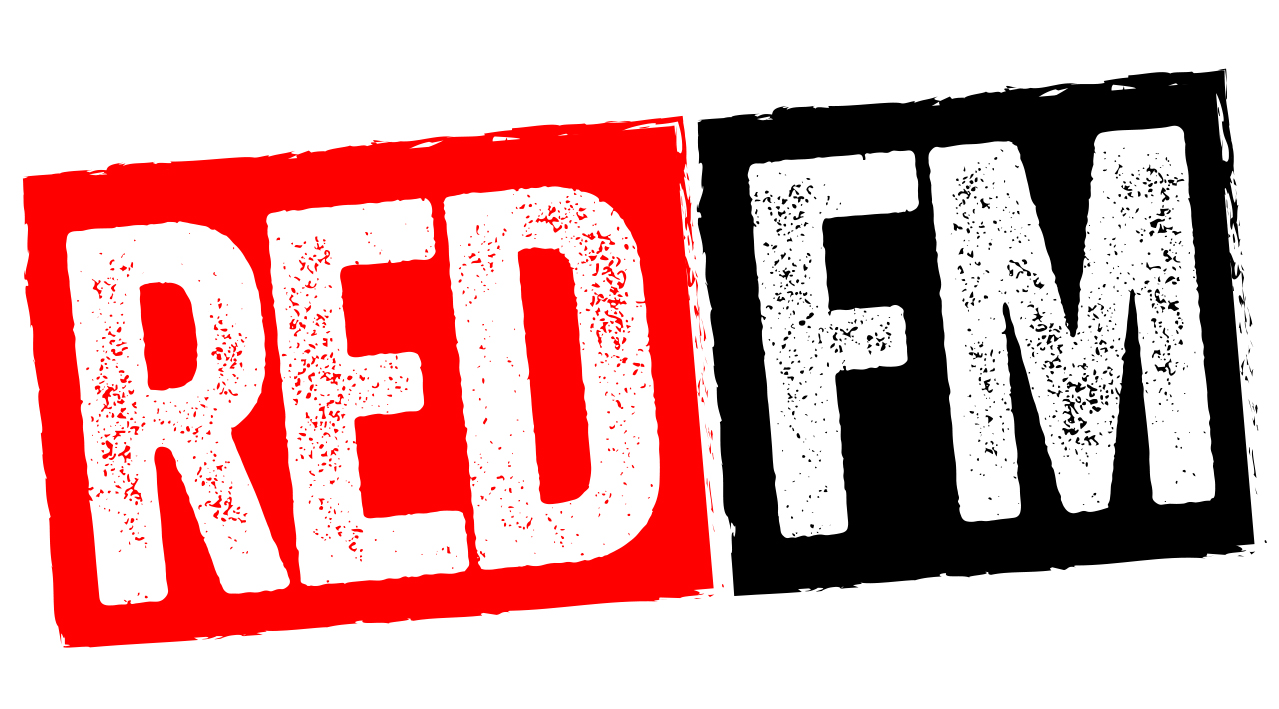
- Australia
- Broadcast area: Western Australia
- Frequency: See below

Programming
- Format: Contemporary hit radio

Ownership
- Owner: Seven West Media
- Sister stations: Spirit Radio Network

History
- First air date: 29 June 1998

Links
- Website: www.redfm.com.au

Red FM was a commercial radio network covering regional Western Australia. Formerly only broadcasting to mine sites, Red FM later covered every town north of Perth and following the re-branding of WAFM, included the major centres of Broome, Port Hedland, Karratha and Geraldton. Red FM was a part of the Redwave Media Group owned by Seven West Media and targeted 18 to 39 year-old listeners with a contemporary hit radio format. Red FM operated under the Australian radio callsigns 6RED, 6HED, 6FMS and 6GGG.

== History ==
Red FM was launched in 1998, initially as a mining radio station providing news and music to the remote mining areas. It later extended its broadcast reach to other remote areas and towns that were previously served by WAFM. Red FM had the largest geographical service area for a commercial radio network in the Southern Hemisphere. Its target audience was the 4–50 group with a potential listening audience of 185,000 people statewide. Red FM generally broadcast to the same area as its sister, the Spirit Radio Network.

In October 2019, Red FM was included in the sale of Redwave Media to Southern Cross Austereo. On 16 March 2020, Red FM programming was replaced with that of Hit Western Australia, with local advertising feeds retained for Broome, Geraldton, Karratha, Port Hedland and remote Western Australia.

Red FM was initially broadcast out of a spare room in a residential house in the Perth riverside suburb of Ascot before moving to commercial studio facilities several years later.

== Frequencies ==
- Argyle 102.7FM
- Barrow Island 103.9FM
- Bremer Bay 103.5FM
- Brockman 2 mine – Pit 8 101.3FM
- Brockman 4 mine 102.1FM
- Broome 101.3FM
- Cape Lambert 91.7FM
- Cervantes 101.5FM
- Channar mine 105.7FM
- Christmas Creek mine 90.9FM
- Drumsite, Christmas Island 98.9FM
- Christmas Island Phosphate Hill 90.9FM
- Christmas Island Rocky Point 106.9FM
- Cloudbreak mine 105.1FM
- Cloudbreak mine 1 97.1FM
- Cloudbreak mine 2 97.9FM
- Cocos Islands (West Island) 100.5FM
- Coorow 101.9FM
- Cue 102.9FM
- Dalwallinu 106.1FM
- Darlot 101.9FM
- DeGrussa Mine 102.9FM
- Derby 102.7FM
- Ellendale 106.9FM
- Eneabba 102.1FM
- Exmouth 102.9FM
- Extension Hill mine 102.5FM
- Fitzroy Crossing 102.9FM
- Fortnum mine 102.1FM
- Garden Well mine 103.3FM
- Geraldton 96.5FM
- Golden Grove 107.9FM
- Green Head 102.1FM
- Halls Creek 102.9FM
- Hope Downs 1 mine 102.9FM
- Hope Downs 4 mine 95.9FM
- Hope Downs Village 91.7FM
- Hopetoun 103.7FM
- Jack Hills mine 94.3FM
- Jimblebar mine 90.9FM
- Jundee 105.7FM
- Jurien Bay 103.1FM
- Kalbarri 102.9FM
- Karara mine 102.1FM
- Karratha 106.5FM
- Koodaideri mine 91.3FM
- Koolyanobbing 107.5FM
- Kununurra 102.5FM
- Lake Gregory 106.9FM
- Lancelin 102.3FM
- Laverton 102.1FM
- Leeman 102.5FM
- Leinster 102.9FM
- Leonora 101.7FM
- Marandoo 102.9FM
- Marandoo mine 102.1FM
- Marble Bar 102.7FM
- Meekatharra 103.1FM
- Mesa A mine 96.9FM
- Mesa J mine 94.1FM
- Moora 90.9FM
- Morawa 103.1FM
- Mount Jackson 107.3FM
- Mount Keith 97.7FM
- Mount Keith Mine 102.9FM
- Mount Magnet 102.5FM
- Mount Welcome 94.5FM
- Mount Whaleback mine 104.1FM
- Murrin Murrin 94.1FM
- Murrin Murrin mine 102.5FM
- Nammuldi mine 94.5FM
- Newman 88.9FM
- Newman Area C mine 106.5FM
- Northcliffe 102.7FM
- Nullagine 103.1FM
- Pannawonica 102.9FM
- Paraburdoo mine 101.3FM
- Perenjori 100.1FM
- Plutonic Gold Mine 105.9FM
- Port Hedland 91.7FM
- Roebourne 95.3FM
- Roy Hill mine 102.9FM
- Sally Malay mine 105.3FM
- Sandstone 104.7FM
- Solomin Mining Area 1 102.7FM
- Solomon Mining Area 2 96.3FM
- Tanami Mines Site 2 97.7FM
- Telfer 106.9FM
- Telfer Mine West Dome 93.3FM
- Three Springs 101.1FM
- Ti Tree 103.7FM
- Tjirrkarli 102.9FM
- Tom Price 105.7FM
- Mount Tom Price mine 103.3FM
- Tropicana Gold Mine 107.7FM
- Walpole 102.9FM
- Warburton 102.1FM
- West Angelas 95.7FM
- West Angelas mine Dep B 88.3FM
- West Angelas mine Dep E 102.9FM
- Western Turner Syncline Mine 88.9FM
- Western Turner Syncline Mine 2 96.3FM
- Windarling 102.9FM
- Wodgina 102.1FM
- Woodie Woodie 92.5FM
- Wyndham 102.9FM
- Yalgoo 104.5FM
- Yandi mine Site 1 98.7FM
- Yandi mine Site 2 94.7FM
- Yandi Junction SW Mine 89.1FM
- Yandicoogina mine 105.7FM
- Yandicoogina Village 99.3FM
- Yiyili 102.9FM
