= ABC Pilbara =

- Australia
- Broadcast area: Gascoyne and Pilbara
- Frequencies: 702 kHz AM and others as listed

Programming
- Format: Talk

Ownership
- Owner: Australian Broadcasting Corporation

History
- First air date: 22 August 1988

Technical information
- Transmitter coordinates: 20°44′14.30″S 116°50′58.20″E

Links
- Website: abc.net.au/pilbara

ABC Pilbara is an ABC Local Radio station based in Karratha. Formerly known as ABC North West WA, the station broadcasts to the Gascoyne and parts of the Pilbara regions of Western Australia. This includes the towns of Port Hedland, Carnarvon, Exmouth, Newman and Tom Price.

The station began as 6KP in 1988 and now broadcasts through the following main AM transmitters:

- 6KP 702 AM Karratha
- 6CA 846 AM Carnarvon
- 6MN 567 AM Newman
- 6PH 603 AM Port Hedland
- 6PN 567 AM Pannawonica
- 6PU 567 AM Paraburdoo
- 6TP 567 AM Tom Price
- 6XM 1188 AM Exmouth

There are also a number of low power FM transmitters.

When local programs are not broadcast, ABC Pilbara is a relay of 720 ABC Perth.

From 8 April 2019, the name of the station was changed to ABC Pilbara from its former name of ABC North West WA to better identify the station's local coverage area.

On 3 May 2022, ABC Pilbara's new studios at The Pelago on Sharpe Avenue in Karratha were officially opened after relocating from their former premises in De Grey Place. According to the ABC, the new location will provide better protection from cyclones enabling the station to provide uninterrupted emergency coverage from the new studios. A new mini-bureau was also opened at Carnarvon on the same day, one of five which had already opened as part of the ABC's regional expansion. The two Carnarvon-based reporters will cover areas such as Shark Bay, Exmouth and Gascoyne Junction.

== See also ==
- List of radio stations in Australia
