= Spirit Radio Network =

Radio network in Western Australia

- Australia
- Broadcast area: Western Australia
- Frequency: See below

Programming
- Format: Hot adult contemporary

Ownership
- Owner: Seven West Media
- Sister stations: Red FM

Links
- Website: www.spiritradio.com.au

Spirit Radio Network was a commercial radio network covering regional Western Australia. It was part of the Redwave Media Group owned by Seven West Media and broadcast to most towns and regional centers in Western Australia including Bunbury, Geraldton, Broome, Port Hedland and Karratha.The Spirit Radio Network targeted 30 to 54 year-old listeners with a Hot AC format and operates under the Australian radio callsigns 6KA, 6NW, 6SAT, 6BAY and 6EL.

== History ==
Spirit Radio Network was first launched as The Star Radio Network in 2000s, however stations 6NW Port Hedland and 6KA Karratha first began broadcasting in the 1970s under the North West Radio branding. The network was later rebranded as The Spirit, later Spirit Radio Network.

In October 2019, Spirit Radio was included in the sale of Redwave Media to Southern Cross Austereo. On 16 March 2020, Spirit Radio programming was replaced with that of Triple M, with local advertising feeds retained for Broome, Geraldton, Karratha, Port Hedland and remote Western Australia.

In May 2020, Crocmedia purchased Spirit Radio Bunbury 621 AM. On 24 August 2020, Spirit Radio was rebranded as SEN Spirit, with the local advertising feed retained for Bunbury.

== Frequencies ==
Spirit Radio Network stations
Market	Frequency
Brockman	106.1FM
Broome	102.9FM
Bunbury (6EL)	621AM
Busselton	621AM
Capel	621AM
Cervantes	101.5FM
Collie	621AM
Cooljarloo	103.9FM
Cue	104.5FM
Dalwallinu	104.5FM
Dandaragan	104.7FM
Derby	104.3FM
Donnybrook	621AM
Eneabba	103.7FM
Exmouth	99.7FM
Geraldton	98.1FM
Granny Smith	95.3FM
Hope Downs	101.3FM
Jack Hills	94.3FM
Jurien Bay	104.7FM
Kalbarri	104.5FM
Karratha	102.5FM
Kununurra	102.5FM
Lake McLeod	99.7FM
Lancelin	103.9FM
Laverton	98.1FM
Learmonth	101.3FM
Leeman	104.1FM
Leinster	101.3FM
Leonora	100.1FM
Meekatharra	101.5FM
Morawa	1512AM
Moora	107.3FM
Mount Magnet	100.9FM
Newman	88.9FM
Pannawonica	101.3FM
Paraburdoo	94.9FM
Pardoo	91.7FM
Perenjori	101.7FM
Port Hedland	94.1FM
Tallering Peak	98.1FM
Tom Price	96.1FM
Warburton	100.5FM
Yarrie	104.5FM

Unlike rival Southern Cross Austereo stations, Spirit Radio Network programming was predominantly based in WA. Local Spirit stations receive twice daily local news bulletins. Statewide weather forecasts are provided on the hour. In the cyclone season, Spirit broadcasts warning updates.
