= Curtin Radio =

Radio station in Perth, Western Australia

Curtin Radio (6NR)
- Bentley, Western Australia; Australia
- Broadcast area: Perth
- Frequency: 100.1 MHz FM

Programming
- Language: English
- Format: Community

History
- First air date: 16 October 1976
- Call sign meaning: 6 New Radio

Technical information
- Licensing authority: ACMA

Links
- Webcast: www.curtinfm.com.au/streamplayer/
- Website: www.curtinfm.com.au
- Building details
- Building housing studio at main Curtin University campus in Bentley, Western Australia

- Location within Perth

General information
- Coordinates: 32.008576°S 115.8928°E

Curtin Radio is a radio station based in Perth, Western Australia. It broadcasts from studios at the Bentley campus of Curtin University. As well as transmitting on FM and as CurtinDG on DAB+, the station also live-streams at their website.

== History ==
The station was formerly known as Curtin Radio 927, and became the state's first community broadcaster on 16 October 1976. It held one of only five special licences granted by the then Minister for the Media, Moss Cass, after he encountered community radio in the US. The station is still officially known as 6NR (6 New Radio), and Curtin University (formerly Western Australian Institute of Technology or just WAIT) continues to hold the licence.

After 26 years of AM broadcasting, the station converted to the FM Band in 2002. It is available in the DAB+ format on digital radio as CurtinDG, streaming services such as iHeartRadio, and live-streams at their website.

According to their website, Curtin Radio has a weekly cumulative listenership in excess of 239,000 people (all ages from 15) and has more than 4000 subscribing members. Curtin Radio also has more than 100 on-air and production volunteers.

== Presenters and Shows ==
Curtin Radio shows and presenters
Time slot	Name	Host(s)
Monday to Friday 6:00am to 9:00am	Breakfast	Greg Pearce and Glenn Mitchell (alternating each week)
Monday to Friday 9:00am to 12:00pm	Mornings with Allan Symons	Allan Symons
Monday to Friday 12:00pm to 3:00pm	Afternoons with Jenny Seaton	Jenny Seaton
Monday to Friday 3:00pm to 6:00pm	Drive with Ray Finn	Ray Finn
Monday 6:00pm to 9:00pm	Monday Evenings	Tracey McGrath and Karina Klass (alternating each week)
Tuesday 6:00pm to 9:00pm	Tuesday Evening	Dale James & George Monaldi (alternating each week)
Wednesday 6:00pm to 9:00pm	Wednesday Evening	John Cranfield’s Reminiscing
Thursday 6:00pm to 9:00pm	Thursday Evening	Alex Richards and Peter Dyball (alternating each week)
Friday 6:00pm to 9:00pm	Friday Evening	John Logan
Monday to Friday 9:00pm to 12:00am	The Late Night Crew	Gary Bryant, George Gray, Gordon Gee, Alan Wilson
Saturday 6:00am to 8:00am	Saturday Breakfast	Chris Bartlett
Saturday 8:00am to 10:0am	Let's Talk Gardening	Faye Arcaro and Rae Burton
Saturday 10:00am to 12:00pm	Classic 60s & 70s	George Monaldi and Jim Krynen (alternating each week)
Saturday 12:00pm to 6:00pm	Born in Boots with Brendon T Moylan	Brendon T Moylan
Saturday 6:00pm to 9:00pm	The Flashback Party Part 1	Neville Riseley
Saturday 9:00pm to 12:00am	The Flashback Party Part 2	Lawrence Noakes
Sunday 6:00am to 9:00am	Easy Listening	Gillian Bush
Sunday 9:00am to 12:00pm	From The Vault	Alan Mannings
Sunday 12:00pm to 3:00pm	Sunday Session	Dean Martin
Sunday 3:00pm to 6:00pm	Sunday Afternoon	Don Dryden
Sunday 6:00pm to 9:00pm	The Album Show	Karl O’Callaghan
Sunday 9:00pm to 12:00am	Sunday Soiree	Tony Fraser and Chris Bartlett (alternating each week)

Volunteer presenters and producers broadcast during the evenings and weekends.

== Newsroom ==
A training ground for students who study at the Curtin School of Journalism, Curtin Radio has assisted with producing some of Western Australia's radio and television journalists.

The Curtin Radio Newsroom is staffed by a full-time journalist. It is also occasionally staffed by volunteer students, who study at the Curtin School of Journalism and prepare news bulletins. The station has news updates from 6 am to 6 pm each weekday and 6 am to midday on weekends.
