= Karratha, Western Australia =

Karratha
- City
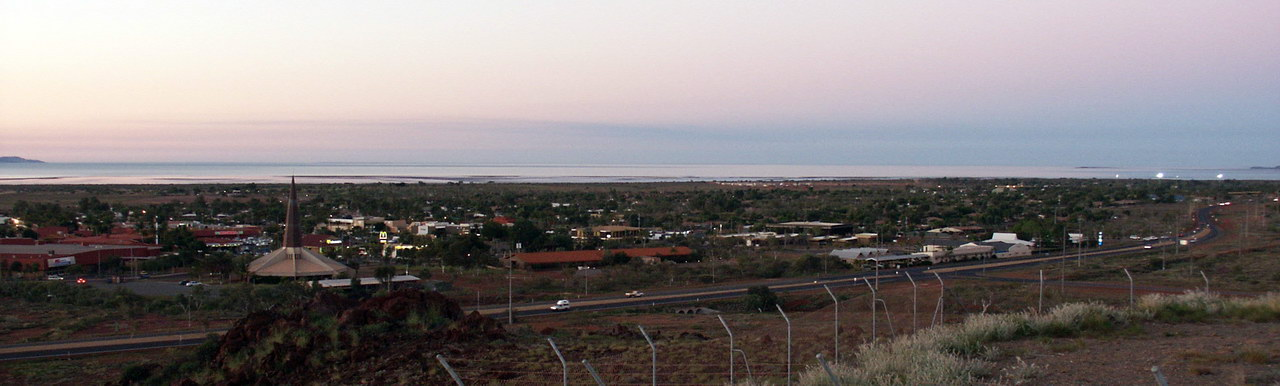
- Panorama of Karratha

- Coordinates: 20°44′11″S 116°50′47″E
- Country: Australia
- State: Western Australia
- LGA: City of Karratha
- Location: 1,575 km (979 mi) N of Perth; 646 km (401 mi) NE of Carnarvon; 238 km (148 mi) W of Port Hedland; 854 km (531 mi) SW of Broome
- Established: 1968

Government
  - State electorate: Pilbara
  - Federal division: Durack
- Elevation: 19 m (62 ft)

Population
  - Total: 17,013 (2021 census)
- Time zone: UTC+8 (AWST)
- Postcode: 6714
- Mean max temp: 32.6 °C (90.7 °F)
- Mean min temp: 20.8 °C (69.4 °F)
- Annual rainfall: 291.8 mm (11.49 in)

Karratha is a city in the Pilbara region of Western Australia, adjoining the port of Dampier. Located about 140 kilometres (87 mi) east-southeast of the site of three nuclear weapons tests by the British (Operation Hurricane in 1952 and Operation Mosaic in 1956), it was established in 1968 to accommodate the processing and exportation workforce of the Hamersley Iron mining company and, in the 1980s, the petroleum and liquefied natural gas operations of the Woodside-operated North West Shelf Venture located on Murujuga. As of the 2021 census, Karratha had an urban population of 17,013. The city's name comes from the cattle station of the same name, which derives from a word in a local Aboriginal language meaning "good country" or "soft earth". More recently, Ngarluma people have indicated the name may actually relate to an early interpretation of Gardarra, stemming from the sacred site for the whale, located in the Karratha area, called Gardarrabuga. The city is the seat of government of the City of Karratha, a local government area covering the surrounding region.

== History ==
The land on which Karratha was established has been Ngarluma country for millennia. In traditional culture, the creation of the landscape occurred in a time called Ngurra Nyujunggamu, meaning "when the world was soft".

Francis Thomas Gregory led an expedition to the north west of Western Australia in 1861. Returning to Perth, he reported the area was suitable for agricultural purposes and a possible pearling industry. This was the major starting point for dispossession of Aboriginal lands across the Karratha area, as pastoralists flocked to the area to establish sheep stations.

During this period of dispossession of Aboriginal people in the Pilbara, the Karratha area became a sheep station. Many Aboriginal people were forced into unpaid labour on the sheep stations, including Karratha Station. By 1946, after Aboriginal people had worked for rations (considered a form of slavery), the Aboriginal community demanded fair wages. Labour costs increased for the Karratha Station following the 1946 Pilbara strike, who were seeking fair pay and conditions after generations of Aboriginal people working on stations for very little or no pay and in poor conditions. Many Aboriginal people "walked off" Pilbara stations at this time.

Archaeological dating suggests that Aboriginal people have inhabited the Pilbara region for the past 40,000 years. The traditional land tenure system of Aboriginal communities, including the Ngarluma people across the Karratha area, stands in contrast to the European notion of land ownership. Instead of individuals possessing exclusive rights to utilise and sell parcels of land, Ngarluma lands were collectively owned by social groups. While certain family groups might inherit rights and responsibilities concerning particular territories, ownership primarily rested on their custodianship of the spiritual significance of the land. This encompassed spiritual sites, stories, songs, ceremonies, and sacred objects. Successive generations were entrusted with the duty of safeguarding these sacred sites, caring for the land, and perpetuating spiritual traditions and practices, with a firm prohibition against land disposal or desecration. This systems remain active today across the Karratha area, though it has been significantly disrupted due to colonisation and dispossession.

The Karratha town is within the Ngarluma native title determination area. Native title determination was made by the Federal Court on 2 May 2005 in Daniel v Western Australia [2005] FCA 536.

More recently, Ngarluma people have indicated the name may actually relate to an early interpretation of Gardarra, stemming from the sacred site for the whale, located in the Karratha area, called Gardarrabuga.

== Geography ==
Karratha, an isolated city, is located approximately 1,535 kilometres (954 mi) north of Perth and 241 kilometres (150 mi) west of Port Hedland on the North West Coastal Highway.

It is at the south central end of Nickol Bay, which has had settlements on the bay since the 1860s.

The city is roughly rectangular in layout and is located on flat land adjacent to Nickol Bay. Tidal salt flats and areas of mangrove separate the city from the sea. Immediately to the south of the city lies a line of low hills.

=== Climate ===
Karratha has a hot desert climate (BWh) classification. Temperatures are warm to hot all year round, with low rainfall, most of which falls in late summer due to the influence of tropical cyclones and the monsoon, although there is a second rainfall peak in early winter as the northern edges of cold fronts occasionally cause rain in the region. It is very rare for any rain to fall in the period from August to December. Winter temperatures rarely drop below 10 °C, while maximums stay in the mid to high 20s and days are sunny with low humidity. Summers are very hot and usually dry although the erratic influence of the monsoon can cause periods of high humidity and thunderstorms. The record high temperature is 48.4 °C (119.1 °F), which was set 13 January 2022, while the record low is 6.9 °C (44.4 °F). The highest monthly rainfall on record was 348.8mm (13.7 in) in February 2011, owing to the passage of Cyclone Carlos and several other monsoonal lows over Karratha; the highest daily rainfall was 274.4 mm (10.80 in) due to the passage of Cyclone Sean on 20 January 2025.

Climate data for Karratha
Month	Jan	Feb	Mar	Apr	May	Jun	Jul	Aug	Sep	Oct	Nov	Dec	Year
Record high °C (°F)	48.4 (119.1)	47.7 (117.9)	45.8 (114.4)	41.3 (106.3)	38.3 (100.9)	32.8 (91.0)	34.0 (93.2)	39.1 (102.4)	40.7 (105.3)	44.7 (112.5)	44.8 (112.6)	46.9 (116.4)	48.4 (119.1)
Mean daily maximum °C (°F)	36.0 (96.8)	35.9 (96.6)	36.3 (97.3)	34.4 (93.9)	30.1 (86.2)	26.6 (79.9)	26.5 (79.7)	28.4 (83.1)	31.1 (88.0)	34.2 (93.6)	35.0 (95.0)	36.1 (97.0)	32.6 (90.6)
Daily mean °C (°F)	31.3 (88.3)	31.2 (88.2)	31.0 (87.8)	28.5 (83.3)	24.1 (75.4)	20.8 (69.4)	20.0 (68.0)	21.3 (70.3)	23.8 (74.8)	27.4 (81.3)	29.1 (84.4)	30.7 (87.3)	26.6 (79.9)
Mean daily minimum °C (°F)	26.7 (80.1)	26.7 (80.1)	25.9 (78.6)	22.7 (72.9)	18.3 (64.9)	15.1 (59.2)	13.8 (56.8)	14.3 (57.7)	16.9 (62.4)	20.8 (69.4)	23.1 (73.6)	25.6 (78.1)	20.8 (69.5)
Record low °C (°F)	20.5 (68.9)	19.4 (66.9)	13.0 (55.4)	10.7 (51.3)	10.5 (50.9)	7.1 (44.8)	6.9 (44.4)	8.0 (46.4)	10.0 (50.0)	11.1 (52.0)	16.0 (60.8)	18.7 (65.7)	6.9 (44.4)
Average rainfall mm (inches)	49.1 (1.93)	78.0 (3.07)	47.8 (1.88)	17.6 (0.69)	28.3 (1.11)	35.3 (1.39)	14.3 (0.56)	4.3 (0.17)	1.3 (0.05)	0.4 (0.02)	1.4 (0.06)	14.0 (0.55)	291.8 (11.48)
Average rainy days (≥ 0.2mm)	4.2	5.3	4.0	1.8	3.2	3.2	2.0	1.1	0.5	0.3	0.4	1.4	27.4
Average afternoon relative humidity (%)	51	55	46	40	42	44	40	35	36	38	41	47	43
Average dew point °C (°F)	23 (73)	23 (73)	22 (72)	18 (64)	13 (55)	11 (52)	9 (48)	10 (50)	12 (54)	16 (61)	18 (64)	21 (70)	16 (61)
Mean daily sunshine hours	11.6	10.1	9.6	8.5	7.3	7.2	7.4	8.5	10.3	12.2	12.3	11.9	9.7
Source 1: Bureau of Meteorology
Source 2: Time and Date (dewpoints 2005-2015) Weather Atlas (sun hours)

== Population ==
As of the 2021 census, there were 17,013 people in Karratha, a decline from the recent peak of 17,927 in 2013.

As of the 2021 census:

- 64.9% of people in Karratha were born in Australia. The next most common countries of birth were New Zealand 4.2%, England 2.6%, Philippines 2.4%, India 1.4% and South Africa 1.3%.
- 72.3% of people in Karratha spoke only English at home. Other languages spoken at home included Tagalog 1.3%, Filipino 0.9%, Mandarin 0.7% and Afrikaans 0.6%.
- The most common responses for religion were no religion 47.5% and Catholic 16.3%.

Aboriginal and Torres Strait Islander people, predominantly Ngarluma, make up 9.0% of the population. The Yinidbarndi, Yaburara, Mardudhunera, and Woon-goo-tt-oo peoples have lived in the surrounding area for approximately 50,000 years. In 2023, the OECD reported extreme disparity in the social and economic wellbeing between many Aboriginal people and those working in the resources sector. The OECD reported that socioeconomic gaps that persist even amid regional affluence. Data show that some areas in Karratha, like Cowrie Court, Ridley Street and Warrier Street in Bulgarra, are among the most disadvantaged in Australia. On the other hand, towns like Dampier, linked to Rio Tinto, are in the top level for socio-economic advantage in the country.

== Economy ==
Karratha's economic base includes the iron ore operations of the Rio Tinto Group; sea-salt mining; ammonia export operations; North West Shelf Venture, Australia's largest natural resource development; the newest natural gas project, Pluto LNG, which is situated adjacent to the existing North West Shelf LNG facility; and the ammonia/technical ammonium nitrate production facility of Yara International.

Karratha came into being in 1968 due to the tremendous growth of the iron-ore industry and the need for a new regional centre caused by a shortage of land in Dampier.

Karratha has the largest shopping centre in the Pilbara, Karratha City, which has major food and grocery retailers and department store chains. It was opened in 1986 as Karratha City and expanded in 2005. The centre also serves the neighbouring towns of Dampier, Wickham and Roebourne. There is also a smaller centre, Karratha Village, which has health services including a pharmacy and medical and dental practices. The Karratha Health Campus is the hospital that services the greater City of Karratha local government area, newly opened in 2018.

== Aboriginal organisations and culture ==
Many Aboriginal organisations are based in the Karratha area. The Ngarluma Aboriginal Corporation is the registered native title body corporate. The Ngarluma Yindjibarndi Foundation Ltd (NYFL) is the representative body for many Traditional Owners across the area. NYFL delivers social, cultural and economic empowerment programs and social impact initiatives, led by the First Nations community. NYFL is recognised for its programs that support food security, employment and training, advocacy and progressing Indigenous self-determination. In 2024, NYFL entered a Memorandum of Understanding with the Australian National University to advance Aboriginal data sovereignty in the area. As of 2022, NYFL is led by Michael Woodley as Chairman, and Sean-Paul Stephens.

The Ngarluma language is the traditional language of the Karratha area. As of 2024, only a handful of fluent Ngarluma speakers remain.

== Facilities ==
Education is provided through four public primary schools, one independent public school and one private primary school, one public and one private high school (Karratha Senior High School and St Luke's College), a TAFE centre with remote university facilities.

A new library was opened in 2018, Karratha Public Library. A new hospital was opened in 2018, Karratha Health Campus. Red Earth Arts Precinct opened in 2018. This venue has a theatre that can also operate as an indoor cinema, outdoor cinema, rehearsal rooms and art spaces.

Karratha Airport has two passenger airlines servicing the city with regular schedules: Qantas and Virgin Australia. The airport also serves as the hub of the Pilbara's light-aircraft and helicopter services, enabling contractors to access offshore destinations and other parts of the region. Cape Preston Aerodrome (ICAO: YCPR) is about 70 kilometres (43 mi) south of town.

=== Annual festivals and events ===
Each year in August Pilbara Iron, Dampier Salt, Woodside Energy, and other smaller companies sponsor one of the largest festivals in the north west, over two days. The name FeNaClNG Festival is derived from Fe (iron), NaCl (salt) and NG (natural gas). Others are Red Earth Arts Festival and Cossack Art Awards.

== Suburbs ==
Karratha comprises the following main suburbs:

- Karratha City Centre
- Bulgarra
- Pegs Creek
- Millars Well
- Nickol
- Nickol West
- Baynton
- Baynton West
- Tambrey
- Mulataga

There is an industrial area, known as both the LIA (Light Industrial Area) and KIE (Karratha Industrial Estate). Gap Ridge, a second industrial estate, is west of the city, past the cemetery.

== Media ==
=== Radio ===
Radio services available in Karratha:

- Vision Christian Radio (1611 AM) – Christian radio station
- Faith FM (87.6 FM) – Religious station
- Karratha FM 93.7 – Country music format
- ABC North West WA (6KP: 702 AM) – Part of the ABC Local Radio network, Talk, news, sport and music
- ABC NewsRadio (6PNN: 104.1 FM) – Rolling news format
- ABC Radio National (6ABCRN: 100.9 FM) – Speciality talk and music
- TAB Racing Radio (FM 101.7)
- Triple J (6JJJ: 103.3 FM) – Alternative music
- Hit FM (106.5 FM) – Top 40 music
- Triple M – Radio 6KA (102.5 FM) – Classic hits / adult contemporary music format aimed at 35+ years audience
- Ngaarda Radio (92.1 FM) – Indigenous radio station, country music / indigenous music and regional news

=== Television ===
Television services available include:

- The Australian Broadcasting Corporation (ABC) – ABC, ABC Family/Kids, ABC Entertains, ABC News (digital channels)
- The Special Broadcasting Service (SBS) – SBS, SBS2, SBS World Movies, SBS WorldWatch, SBS Food, NITV (digital channels)
- Seven, an owned and operated station of the Seven Network
- WIN Television, an affiliate station of the Nine Network
- West Digital Television, an affiliate station of the Network 10 (provided jointly by Seven Media Group and WIN Television)

The programming schedule is mainly the same as the Seven, Nine and Ten stations in Perth with variations for news bulletins, sport telecasts such as the Australian Football League and National Rugby League, children's and lifestyle programs and infomercials. Seven produces a 30-minute regional news program each weeknight (broadcast from Bunbury) with a newsroom based in the town, covering the surrounding areas.

=== Newspapers ===
The local newspaper is The Pilbara News (owned by Seven Media Group, publisher of The West Australian). An independent local newspaper, which included classifieds, The Pilbara Echo, closed in April 2014. Newspapers from Perth including The West Australian and The Sunday Times are also available, as well as national newspapers such as The Australian and The Australian Financial Review.

== Sport ==
The North Pilbara Football League is an Australian rules football league with six teams: Karratha Kats, Karratha Falcons, Dampier Sharks, Wickham Wolves, Port Hedland Rovers and South Hedland Swans.

The Pilbara Rugby League has six teams: Karratha Stormers, Karratha Broncos, Karratha Roosters, Port Hedland Juniors, South Hedland Cougars and Wickham Wasps.

Soccer has five teams: Bulgarra Glory, Karratha Snow Whites, Nickol, Dampier Red Dogs and Salt.

West Pilbara Cricket Association has six teams: Karratha Kats, Baynton Lions, Rec Club, Dampier Taverners, Wickham Wallabies and Pegs Creek Crabs.

The Karratha Netball Association runs junior and senior competitions with nine participating clubs: Karratha Kats, Karratha Falcons, Dampier Sharks, Blades, Burrup Flames, Karratha Cougars, Tequiras, Karratha Thunderbolts and Wickham Junior Netball Club.
